

26001–26100 

|-bgcolor=#E9E9E9
| 26001 ||  || — || March 16, 2001 || Socorro || LINEAR || — || align=right | 8.2 km || 
|-id=002 bgcolor=#E9E9E9
| 26002 Angelayeung ||  ||  || March 18, 2001 || Socorro || LINEAR || — || align=right | 3.2 km || 
|-id=003 bgcolor=#d6d6d6
| 26003 Amundson ||  ||  || March 18, 2001 || Anderson Mesa || LONEOS || KOR || align=right | 3.8 km || 
|-id=004 bgcolor=#fefefe
| 26004 Loriying ||  ||  || March 18, 2001 || Socorro || LINEAR || NYS || align=right | 1.9 km || 
|-id=005 bgcolor=#fefefe
| 26005 Alicezhao ||  ||  || March 18, 2001 || Socorro || LINEAR || NYS || align=right | 1.9 km || 
|-id=006 bgcolor=#fefefe
| 26006 ||  || — || March 18, 2001 || Kitt Peak || Spacewatch || — || align=right | 1.7 km || 
|-id=007 bgcolor=#E9E9E9
| 26007 Lindazhou ||  ||  || March 26, 2001 || Socorro || LINEAR || — || align=right | 2.8 km || 
|-id=008 bgcolor=#fefefe
| 26008 ||  || — || March 29, 2001 || Socorro || LINEAR || — || align=right | 2.4 km || 
|-id=009 bgcolor=#fefefe
| 26009 ||  || — || March 26, 2001 || Socorro || LINEAR || V || align=right | 1.8 km || 
|-id=010 bgcolor=#fefefe
| 26010 ||  || — || March 26, 2001 || Socorro || LINEAR || NYS || align=right | 1.9 km || 
|-id=011 bgcolor=#E9E9E9
| 26011 Cornelius ||  ||  || March 21, 2001 || Anderson Mesa || LONEOS || — || align=right | 3.6 km || 
|-id=012 bgcolor=#E9E9E9
| 26012 Sanborn ||  ||  || March 24, 2001 || Anderson Mesa || LONEOS || MAR || align=right | 4.5 km || 
|-id=013 bgcolor=#fefefe
| 26013 Amandalonzo ||  ||  || March 24, 2001 || Socorro || LINEAR || — || align=right | 2.2 km || 
|-id=014 bgcolor=#fefefe
| 26014 || 2051 P-L || — || September 24, 1960 || Palomar || PLS || — || align=right | 2.6 km || 
|-id=015 bgcolor=#fefefe
| 26015 || 2076 P-L || — || September 26, 1960 || Palomar || PLS || — || align=right | 3.0 km || 
|-id=016 bgcolor=#fefefe
| 26016 || 2633 P-L || — || September 24, 1960 || Palomar || PLS || NYS || align=right | 2.0 km || 
|-id=017 bgcolor=#E9E9E9
| 26017 || 2674 P-L || — || September 24, 1960 || Palomar || PLS || — || align=right | 5.6 km || 
|-id=018 bgcolor=#d6d6d6
| 26018 || 2695 P-L || — || September 24, 1960 || Palomar || PLS || — || align=right | 7.4 km || 
|-id=019 bgcolor=#E9E9E9
| 26019 || 2768 P-L || — || September 24, 1960 || Palomar || PLS || — || align=right | 5.6 km || 
|-id=020 bgcolor=#E9E9E9
| 26020 || 3094 P-L || — || September 24, 1960 || Palomar || PLS || — || align=right | 3.5 km || 
|-id=021 bgcolor=#fefefe
| 26021 || 4177 P-L || — || September 24, 1960 || Palomar || PLS || — || align=right | 3.3 km || 
|-id=022 bgcolor=#fefefe
| 26022 || 4180 P-L || — || September 24, 1960 || Palomar || PLS || — || align=right | 2.4 km || 
|-id=023 bgcolor=#d6d6d6
| 26023 || 4538 P-L || — || September 24, 1960 || Palomar || PLS || — || align=right | 3.9 km || 
|-id=024 bgcolor=#fefefe
| 26024 || 4543 P-L || — || September 24, 1960 || Palomar || PLS || — || align=right | 2.3 km || 
|-id=025 bgcolor=#fefefe
| 26025 || 4587 P-L || — || September 24, 1960 || Palomar || PLS || NYS || align=right | 5.8 km || 
|-id=026 bgcolor=#E9E9E9
| 26026 || 4664 P-L || — || September 24, 1960 || Palomar || PLS || GEF || align=right | 8.2 km || 
|-id=027 bgcolor=#fefefe
| 26027 Cotopaxi || 4861 P-L ||  || September 24, 1960 || Palomar || PLS || H || align=right | 1.5 km || 
|-id=028 bgcolor=#E9E9E9
| 26028 || 5554 P-L || — || October 17, 1960 || Palomar || PLS || — || align=right | 4.3 km || 
|-id=029 bgcolor=#fefefe
| 26029 || 5565 P-L || — || October 17, 1960 || Palomar || PLS || — || align=right | 3.5 km || 
|-id=030 bgcolor=#E9E9E9
| 26030 || 6004 P-L || — || September 24, 1960 || Palomar || PLS || — || align=right | 2.3 km || 
|-id=031 bgcolor=#fefefe
| 26031 || 6074 P-L || — || September 24, 1960 || Palomar || PLS || — || align=right | 1.7 km || 
|-id=032 bgcolor=#E9E9E9
| 26032 || 6556 P-L || — || September 24, 1960 || Palomar || PLS || — || align=right | 5.3 km || 
|-id=033 bgcolor=#fefefe
| 26033 || 6801 P-L || — || September 24, 1960 || Palomar || PLS || NYS || align=right | 1.7 km || 
|-id=034 bgcolor=#E9E9E9
| 26034 || 9611 P-L || — || October 17, 1960 || Palomar || PLS || — || align=right | 3.0 km || 
|-id=035 bgcolor=#fefefe
| 26035 || 1119 T-1 || — || March 25, 1971 || Palomar || PLS || — || align=right | 2.2 km || 
|-id=036 bgcolor=#fefefe
| 26036 || 2166 T-1 || — || March 25, 1971 || Palomar || PLS || FLO || align=right | 3.2 km || 
|-id=037 bgcolor=#fefefe
| 26037 || 2183 T-1 || — || March 25, 1971 || Palomar || PLS || MAS || align=right | 2.2 km || 
|-id=038 bgcolor=#E9E9E9
| 26038 || 2290 T-1 || — || March 25, 1971 || Palomar || PLS || — || align=right | 4.1 km || 
|-id=039 bgcolor=#fefefe
| 26039 || 3268 T-1 || — || March 26, 1971 || Palomar || PLS || V || align=right | 1.9 km || 
|-id=040 bgcolor=#fefefe
| 26040 || 3747 T-1 || — || May 13, 1971 || Palomar || PLS || — || align=right | 3.3 km || 
|-id=041 bgcolor=#fefefe
| 26041 || 4172 T-1 || — || March 26, 1971 || Palomar || PLS || — || align=right | 3.5 km || 
|-id=042 bgcolor=#d6d6d6
| 26042 || 4242 T-1 || — || March 26, 1971 || Palomar || PLS || — || align=right | 11 km || 
|-id=043 bgcolor=#fefefe
| 26043 || 4319 T-1 || — || March 26, 1971 || Palomar || PLS || — || align=right | 3.7 km || 
|-id=044 bgcolor=#d6d6d6
| 26044 || 1259 T-2 || — || September 29, 1973 || Palomar || PLS || KOR || align=right | 5.9 km || 
|-id=045 bgcolor=#fefefe
| 26045 || 1582 T-2 || — || September 24, 1973 || Palomar || PLS || — || align=right | 2.1 km || 
|-id=046 bgcolor=#d6d6d6
| 26046 || 2104 T-2 || — || September 29, 1973 || Palomar || PLS || KOR || align=right | 4.1 km || 
|-id=047 bgcolor=#E9E9E9
| 26047 || 2148 T-2 || — || September 29, 1973 || Palomar || PLS || ADE || align=right | 6.5 km || 
|-id=048 bgcolor=#fefefe
| 26048 || 2409 T-2 || — || September 25, 1973 || Palomar || PLS || — || align=right | 2.3 km || 
|-id=049 bgcolor=#E9E9E9
| 26049 || 3161 T-2 || — || September 30, 1973 || Palomar || PLS || — || align=right | 2.0 km || 
|-id=050 bgcolor=#FA8072
| 26050 || 3167 T-2 || — || September 30, 1973 || Palomar || PLS || — || align=right | 1.8 km || 
|-id=051 bgcolor=#d6d6d6
| 26051 || 3200 T-2 || — || September 30, 1973 || Palomar || PLS || KOR || align=right | 3.7 km || 
|-id=052 bgcolor=#d6d6d6
| 26052 || 3230 T-2 || — || September 30, 1973 || Palomar || PLS || 7:4 || align=right | 7.8 km || 
|-id=053 bgcolor=#E9E9E9
| 26053 || 4081 T-2 || — || September 29, 1973 || Palomar || PLS || — || align=right | 2.3 km || 
|-id=054 bgcolor=#fefefe
| 26054 || 4231 T-2 || — || September 29, 1973 || Palomar || PLS || V || align=right | 3.1 km || 
|-id=055 bgcolor=#d6d6d6
| 26055 || 4257 T-2 || — || September 29, 1973 || Palomar || PLS || KOR || align=right | 3.9 km || 
|-id=056 bgcolor=#d6d6d6
| 26056 || 4281 T-2 || — || September 29, 1973 || Palomar || PLS || ITH || align=right | 4.1 km || 
|-id=057 bgcolor=#C2FFFF
| 26057 Ankaios || 4742 T-2 ||  || September 30, 1973 || Palomar || PLS || L4 || align=right | 19 km || 
|-id=058 bgcolor=#d6d6d6
| 26058 || 1061 T-3 || — || October 17, 1977 || Palomar || PLS || — || align=right | 5.9 km || 
|-id=059 bgcolor=#fefefe
| 26059 || 1089 T-3 || — || October 17, 1977 || Palomar || PLS || FLO || align=right | 2.9 km || 
|-id=060 bgcolor=#d6d6d6
| 26060 || 1164 T-3 || — || October 17, 1977 || Palomar || PLS || — || align=right | 6.5 km || 
|-id=061 bgcolor=#fefefe
| 26061 || 2315 T-3 || — || October 16, 1977 || Palomar || PLS || — || align=right | 4.9 km || 
|-id=062 bgcolor=#d6d6d6
| 26062 || 2466 T-3 || — || October 16, 1977 || Palomar || PLS || EOS || align=right | 7.1 km || 
|-id=063 bgcolor=#E9E9E9
| 26063 || 2634 T-3 || — || October 16, 1977 || Palomar || PLS || — || align=right | 2.9 km || 
|-id=064 bgcolor=#fefefe
| 26064 || 3500 T-3 || — || October 16, 1977 || Palomar || PLS || V || align=right | 1.6 km || 
|-id=065 bgcolor=#fefefe
| 26065 || 3761 T-3 || — || October 16, 1977 || Palomar || PLS || — || align=right | 1.9 km || 
|-id=066 bgcolor=#fefefe
| 26066 || 4031 T-3 || — || October 16, 1977 || Palomar || PLS || — || align=right | 2.4 km || 
|-id=067 bgcolor=#d6d6d6
| 26067 || 4079 T-3 || — || October 16, 1977 || Palomar || PLS || EOS || align=right | 5.8 km || 
|-id=068 bgcolor=#fefefe
| 26068 || 4093 T-3 || — || October 16, 1977 || Palomar || PLS || V || align=right | 1.8 km || 
|-id=069 bgcolor=#fefefe
| 26069 || 4215 T-3 || — || October 16, 1977 || Palomar || PLS || FLO || align=right | 2.0 km || 
|-id=070 bgcolor=#fefefe
| 26070 || 4240 T-3 || — || October 16, 1977 || Palomar || PLS || — || align=right | 1.6 km || 
|-id=071 bgcolor=#d6d6d6
| 26071 || 4335 T-3 || — || October 16, 1977 || Palomar || PLS || — || align=right | 5.3 km || 
|-id=072 bgcolor=#d6d6d6
| 26072 || 5155 T-3 || — || October 16, 1977 || Palomar || PLS || EOS || align=right | 5.4 km || 
|-id=073 bgcolor=#d6d6d6
| 26073 || 5168 T-3 || — || October 16, 1977 || Palomar || PLS || EOS || align=right | 7.2 km || 
|-id=074 bgcolor=#FA8072
| 26074 Carlwirtz || 1977 TD ||  || October 8, 1977 || La Silla || H.-E. Schuster || Hmoon || align=right | 3.0 km || 
|-id=075 bgcolor=#fefefe
| 26075 Levitsvet ||  ||  || August 8, 1978 || Nauchnij || N. S. Chernykh || — || align=right | 2.4 km || 
|-id=076 bgcolor=#d6d6d6
| 26076 ||  || — || June 25, 1979 || Siding Spring || E. F. Helin, S. J. Bus || — || align=right | 13 km || 
|-id=077 bgcolor=#fefefe
| 26077 ||  || — || June 25, 1979 || Siding Spring || E. F. Helin, S. J. Bus || — || align=right | 2.5 km || 
|-id=078 bgcolor=#E9E9E9
| 26078 ||  || — || June 25, 1979 || Siding Spring || E. F. Helin, S. J. Bus || WIT || align=right | 3.5 km || 
|-id=079 bgcolor=#E9E9E9
| 26079 ||  || — || June 25, 1979 || Siding Spring || E. F. Helin, S. J. Bus || — || align=right | 3.9 km || 
|-id=080 bgcolor=#fefefe
| 26080 Pablomarques || 1980 EF ||  || March 14, 1980 || Anderson Mesa || E. Bowell || — || align=right | 7.2 km || 
|-id=081 bgcolor=#d6d6d6
| 26081 ||  || — || August 6, 1980 || La Silla || R. M. West || — || align=right | 8.0 km || 
|-id=082 bgcolor=#fefefe
| 26082 ||  || — || March 1, 1981 || Siding Spring || S. J. Bus || — || align=right | 2.6 km || 
|-id=083 bgcolor=#fefefe
| 26083 ||  || — || March 1, 1981 || Siding Spring || S. J. Bus || slow || align=right | 3.6 km || 
|-id=084 bgcolor=#fefefe
| 26084 ||  || — || March 1, 1981 || Siding Spring || S. J. Bus || Vslow || align=right | 2.4 km || 
|-id=085 bgcolor=#d6d6d6
| 26085 ||  || — || March 2, 1981 || Siding Spring || S. J. Bus || — || align=right | 6.1 km || 
|-id=086 bgcolor=#d6d6d6
| 26086 ||  || — || October 24, 1981 || Palomar || S. J. Bus || ALA || align=right | 19 km || 
|-id=087 bgcolor=#fefefe
| 26087 Zhuravleva ||  ||  || October 21, 1982 || Nauchnij || L. G. Karachkina || — || align=right | 4.1 km || 
|-id=088 bgcolor=#E9E9E9
| 26088 ||  || — || August 17, 1985 || Palomar || E. F. Helin || EUN || align=right | 5.1 km || 
|-id=089 bgcolor=#E9E9E9
| 26089 ||  || — || August 17, 1985 || Palomar || E. F. Helin || — || align=right | 3.4 km || 
|-id=090 bgcolor=#fefefe
| 26090 ||  || — || August 1, 1986 || Palomar || M. Rudnyk || MAS || align=right | 2.5 km || 
|-id=091 bgcolor=#fefefe
| 26091 ||  || — || September 13, 1987 || La Silla || H. Debehogne || — || align=right | 2.5 km || 
|-id=092 bgcolor=#fefefe
| 26092 Norikonoriyuki || 1987 SF ||  || September 16, 1987 || Geisei || T. Seki || — || align=right | 3.1 km || 
|-id=093 bgcolor=#fefefe
| 26093 ||  || — || October 25, 1987 || Kushiro || S. Ueda, H. Kaneda || — || align=right | 5.3 km || 
|-id=094 bgcolor=#E9E9E9
| 26094 || 1988 NU || — || July 11, 1988 || Palomar || E. F. Helin || — || align=right | 5.1 km || 
|-id=095 bgcolor=#E9E9E9
| 26095 || 1988 PU || — || August 10, 1988 || Palomar || C. Mikolajczak, R. Coker || — || align=right | 6.6 km || 
|-id=096 bgcolor=#E9E9E9
| 26096 ||  || — || September 16, 1988 || Cerro Tololo || S. J. Bus || — || align=right | 4.1 km || 
|-id=097 bgcolor=#fefefe
| 26097 Kamishi ||  ||  || November 6, 1988 || Geisei || T. Seki || FLO || align=right | 3.4 km || 
|-id=098 bgcolor=#fefefe
| 26098 ||  || — || January 4, 1989 || Siding Spring || R. H. McNaught || FLO || align=right | 3.5 km || 
|-id=099 bgcolor=#E9E9E9
| 26099 || 1989 WH || — || November 20, 1989 || Gekko || Y. Oshima || GEF || align=right | 4.1 km || 
|-id=100 bgcolor=#fefefe
| 26100 ||  || — || August 29, 1990 || Palomar || H. E. Holt || NYS || align=right | 2.4 km || 
|}

26101–26200 

|-bgcolor=#fefefe
| 26101 ||  || — || August 20, 1990 || La Silla || E. W. Elst || — || align=right | 2.7 km || 
|-id=102 bgcolor=#d6d6d6
| 26102 ||  || — || August 16, 1990 || La Silla || E. W. Elst || — || align=right | 10 km || 
|-id=103 bgcolor=#fefefe
| 26103 ||  || — || September 18, 1990 || Palomar || H. E. Holt || — || align=right | 6.3 km || 
|-id=104 bgcolor=#fefefe
| 26104 ||  || — || November 11, 1990 || Kitami || K. Endate, K. Watanabe || — || align=right | 4.8 km || 
|-id=105 bgcolor=#fefefe
| 26105 ||  || — || November 15, 1990 || La Silla || E. W. Elst || — || align=right | 3.0 km || 
|-id=106 bgcolor=#E9E9E9
| 26106 ||  || — || November 18, 1990 || La Silla || E. W. Elst || HNS || align=right | 5.0 km || 
|-id=107 bgcolor=#E9E9E9
| 26107 ||  || — || April 8, 1991 || La Silla || E. W. Elst || — || align=right | 5.4 km || 
|-id=108 bgcolor=#d6d6d6
| 26108 ||  || — || June 6, 1991 || La Silla || E. W. Elst || KOR || align=right | 5.5 km || 
|-id=109 bgcolor=#fefefe
| 26109 ||  || — || June 6, 1991 || La Silla || E. W. Elst || FLO || align=right | 2.0 km || 
|-id=110 bgcolor=#fefefe
| 26110 ||  || — || July 8, 1991 || La Silla || H. Debehogne || FLO || align=right | 3.8 km || 
|-id=111 bgcolor=#fefefe
| 26111 || 1991 OV || — || July 18, 1991 || Palomar || H. E. Holt || FLO || align=right | 2.9 km || 
|-id=112 bgcolor=#d6d6d6
| 26112 ||  || — || August 8, 1991 || Palomar || H. E. Holt || 2:1J || align=right | 9.1 km || 
|-id=113 bgcolor=#fefefe
| 26113 ||  || — || August 8, 1991 || Palomar || H. E. Holt || FLO || align=right | 1.8 km || 
|-id=114 bgcolor=#d6d6d6
| 26114 || 1991 QG || — || August 31, 1991 || Kiyosato || S. Otomo || — || align=right | 7.7 km || 
|-id=115 bgcolor=#fefefe
| 26115 ||  || — || September 15, 1991 || Palomar || H. E. Holt || — || align=right | 3.8 km || 
|-id=116 bgcolor=#fefefe
| 26116 ||  || — || September 13, 1991 || Palomar || H. E. Holt || — || align=right | 3.1 km || 
|-id=117 bgcolor=#d6d6d6
| 26117 ||  || — || September 11, 1991 || Palomar || H. E. Holt || — || align=right | 11 km || 
|-id=118 bgcolor=#fefefe
| 26118 || 1991 TH || — || October 1, 1991 || Siding Spring || R. H. McNaught || — || align=right | 3.2 km || 
|-id=119 bgcolor=#fefefe
| 26119 Duden ||  ||  || October 7, 1991 || Tautenburg Observatory || F. Börngen || NYS || align=right | 2.0 km || 
|-id=120 bgcolor=#FA8072
| 26120 ||  || — || November 5, 1991 || Dynic || A. Sugie || — || align=right | 2.6 km || 
|-id=121 bgcolor=#fefefe
| 26121 || 1992 BX || — || January 28, 1992 || Kushiro || S. Ueda, H. Kaneda || CHL || align=right | 8.5 km || 
|-id=122 bgcolor=#E9E9E9
| 26122 Antonysutton ||  ||  || February 2, 1992 || La Silla || E. W. Elst || — || align=right | 4.1 km || 
|-id=123 bgcolor=#E9E9E9
| 26123 Hiroshiyoshida || 1992 OK ||  || July 29, 1992 || Geisei || T. Seki || — || align=right | 5.8 km || 
|-id=124 bgcolor=#E9E9E9
| 26124 ||  || — || August 2, 1992 || Palomar || H. E. Holt || CLO || align=right | 6.3 km || 
|-id=125 bgcolor=#E9E9E9
| 26125 || 1992 RG || — || September 3, 1992 || Kiyosato || S. Otomo || — || align=right | 12 km || 
|-id=126 bgcolor=#d6d6d6
| 26126 ||  || — || September 2, 1992 || La Silla || E. W. Elst || JLI || align=right | 5.5 km || 
|-id=127 bgcolor=#fefefe
| 26127 Otakasakajyo ||  ||  || January 19, 1993 || Geisei || T. Seki || — || align=right | 3.1 km || 
|-id=128 bgcolor=#d6d6d6
| 26128 ||  || — || January 22, 1993 || Kitt Peak || Spacewatch || — || align=right | 11 km || 
|-id=129 bgcolor=#FA8072
| 26129 || 1993 DK || — || February 19, 1993 || Oohira || T. Urata || — || align=right | 4.7 km || 
|-id=130 bgcolor=#fefefe
| 26130 ||  || — || March 17, 1993 || La Silla || UESAC || NYS || align=right | 2.1 km || 
|-id=131 bgcolor=#fefefe
| 26131 ||  || — || March 17, 1993 || La Silla || UESAC || — || align=right | 2.6 km || 
|-id=132 bgcolor=#fefefe
| 26132 ||  || — || March 21, 1993 || La Silla || UESAC || NYS || align=right | 2.1 km || 
|-id=133 bgcolor=#fefefe
| 26133 ||  || — || March 21, 1993 || La Silla || UESAC || — || align=right | 4.5 km || 
|-id=134 bgcolor=#fefefe
| 26134 ||  || — || March 19, 1993 || La Silla || UESAC || V || align=right | 2.0 km || 
|-id=135 bgcolor=#E9E9E9
| 26135 ||  || — || April 12, 1993 || La Silla || H. Debehogne || — || align=right | 10 km || 
|-id=136 bgcolor=#E9E9E9
| 26136 ||  || — || July 20, 1993 || La Silla || E. W. Elst || — || align=right | 4.3 km || 
|-id=137 bgcolor=#E9E9E9
| 26137 ||  || — || August 16, 1993 || Caussols || E. W. Elst || HEN || align=right | 3.9 km || 
|-id=138 bgcolor=#E9E9E9
| 26138 ||  || — || October 9, 1993 || La Silla || E. W. Elst || — || align=right | 4.0 km || 
|-id=139 bgcolor=#E9E9E9
| 26139 ||  || — || October 9, 1993 || La Silla || E. W. Elst || — || align=right | 4.8 km || 
|-id=140 bgcolor=#d6d6d6
| 26140 ||  || — || February 7, 1994 || La Silla || E. W. Elst || THM || align=right | 7.8 km || 
|-id=141 bgcolor=#fefefe
| 26141 ||  || — || April 5, 1994 || Kitt Peak || Spacewatch || — || align=right | 1.6 km || 
|-id=142 bgcolor=#fefefe
| 26142 ||  || — || August 3, 1994 || Siding Spring || R. H. McNaught || PHO || align=right | 2.7 km || 
|-id=143 bgcolor=#fefefe
| 26143 ||  || — || August 10, 1994 || La Silla || E. W. Elst || V || align=right | 1.8 km || 
|-id=144 bgcolor=#E9E9E9
| 26144 ||  || — || August 10, 1994 || La Silla || E. W. Elst || — || align=right | 4.6 km || 
|-id=145 bgcolor=#fefefe
| 26145 ||  || — || August 12, 1994 || La Silla || E. W. Elst || V || align=right | 3.6 km || 
|-id=146 bgcolor=#fefefe
| 26146 ||  || — || August 12, 1994 || La Silla || E. W. Elst || NYS || align=right | 1.8 km || 
|-id=147 bgcolor=#E9E9E9
| 26147 ||  || — || August 12, 1994 || La Silla || E. W. Elst || — || align=right | 2.4 km || 
|-id=148 bgcolor=#fefefe
| 26148 ||  || — || August 10, 1994 || La Silla || E. W. Elst || FLO || align=right | 2.6 km || 
|-id=149 bgcolor=#E9E9E9
| 26149 ||  || — || August 10, 1994 || La Silla || E. W. Elst || — || align=right | 2.7 km || 
|-id=150 bgcolor=#fefefe
| 26150 ||  || — || September 4, 1994 || Palomar || E. F. Helin || — || align=right | 5.7 km || 
|-id=151 bgcolor=#fefefe
| 26151 Irinokaigan ||  ||  || October 2, 1994 || Geisei || T. Seki || PHO || align=right | 4.1 km || 
|-id=152 bgcolor=#fefefe
| 26152 || 1994 UF || — || October 24, 1994 || Siding Spring || R. H. McNaught || — || align=right | 5.4 km || 
|-id=153 bgcolor=#E9E9E9
| 26153 || 1994 UY || — || October 31, 1994 || Nachi-Katsuura || Y. Shimizu, T. Urata || — || align=right | 2.9 km || 
|-id=154 bgcolor=#E9E9E9
| 26154 ||  || — || November 4, 1994 || Oizumi || T. Kobayashi || MAR || align=right | 3.7 km || 
|-id=155 bgcolor=#fefefe
| 26155 ||  || — || November 8, 1994 || Kiyosato || S. Otomo || NYS || align=right | 3.7 km || 
|-id=156 bgcolor=#E9E9E9
| 26156 || 1994 WT || — || November 25, 1994 || Oizumi || T. Kobayashi || — || align=right | 3.5 km || 
|-id=157 bgcolor=#fefefe
| 26157 ||  || — || November 25, 1994 || Oizumi || T. Kobayashi || NYS || align=right | 2.9 km || 
|-id=158 bgcolor=#E9E9E9
| 26158 ||  || — || November 27, 1994 || Oizumi || T. Kobayashi || — || align=right | 6.7 km || 
|-id=159 bgcolor=#E9E9E9
| 26159 ||  || — || November 28, 1994 || Kushiro || S. Ueda, H. Kaneda || — || align=right | 3.8 km || 
|-id=160 bgcolor=#E9E9E9
| 26160 ||  || — || December 9, 1994 || Oizumi || T. Kobayashi || — || align=right | 11 km || 
|-id=161 bgcolor=#E9E9E9
| 26161 ||  || — || January 27, 1995 || Kiyosato || S. Otomo || EUN || align=right | 5.2 km || 
|-id=162 bgcolor=#E9E9E9
| 26162 ||  || — || January 31, 1995 || Kitt Peak || Spacewatch || — || align=right | 6.0 km || 
|-id=163 bgcolor=#d6d6d6
| 26163 || 1995 DW || — || February 20, 1995 || Oizumi || T. Kobayashi || — || align=right | 5.3 km || 
|-id=164 bgcolor=#E9E9E9
| 26164 ||  || — || March 23, 1995 || Kitt Peak || Spacewatch || PAE || align=right | 14 km || 
|-id=165 bgcolor=#d6d6d6
| 26165 ||  || — || March 23, 1995 || Kitt Peak || Spacewatch || — || align=right | 5.0 km || 
|-id=166 bgcolor=#FFC2E0
| 26166 ||  || — || August 31, 1995 || Kitt Peak || Spacewatch || AMO +1km2:1J || align=right | 1.5 km || 
|-id=167 bgcolor=#fefefe
| 26167 ||  || — || September 18, 1995 || Catalina Station || T. B. Spahr || PHO || align=right | 3.6 km || 
|-id=168 bgcolor=#fefefe
| 26168 Kanaikiyotaka ||  ||  || November 24, 1995 || Ojima || T. Niijima || FLO || align=right | 2.3 km || 
|-id=169 bgcolor=#fefefe
| 26169 Ishikawakiyoshi || 1995 YY ||  || December 21, 1995 || Oizumi || T. Kobayashi || — || align=right | 2.7 km || 
|-id=170 bgcolor=#E9E9E9
| 26170 Kazuhiko ||  ||  || January 24, 1996 || Ojima || T. Niijima || — || align=right | 4.9 km || 
|-id=171 bgcolor=#fefefe
| 26171 ||  || — || January 17, 1996 || Kitami || K. Endate, K. Watanabe || — || align=right | 9.6 km || 
|-id=172 bgcolor=#E9E9E9
| 26172 ||  || — || January 18, 1996 || Kitt Peak || Spacewatch || MAR || align=right | 2.4 km || 
|-id=173 bgcolor=#E9E9E9
| 26173 ||  || — || February 23, 1996 || Oizumi || T. Kobayashi || — || align=right | 4.6 km || 
|-id=174 bgcolor=#E9E9E9
| 26174 ||  || — || March 15, 1996 || Haleakala || NEAT || — || align=right | 4.6 km || 
|-id=175 bgcolor=#E9E9E9
| 26175 ||  || — || March 13, 1996 || Kitt Peak || Spacewatch || — || align=right | 5.1 km || 
|-id=176 bgcolor=#E9E9E9
| 26176 ||  || — || April 15, 1996 || Haleakala || AMOS || — || align=right | 7.4 km || 
|-id=177 bgcolor=#E9E9E9
| 26177 Fabiodolfi ||  ||  || April 12, 1996 || San Marcello || L. Tesi, A. Boattini || — || align=right | 6.6 km || 
|-id=178 bgcolor=#E9E9E9
| 26178 ||  || — || April 11, 1996 || Xinglong || SCAP || EUN || align=right | 4.9 km || 
|-id=179 bgcolor=#E9E9E9
| 26179 ||  || — || April 9, 1996 || Kitt Peak || Spacewatch || HEN || align=right | 3.4 km || 
|-id=180 bgcolor=#E9E9E9
| 26180 ||  || — || April 13, 1996 || Kitt Peak || Spacewatch || — || align=right | 6.4 km || 
|-id=181 bgcolor=#C2E0FF
| 26181 ||  || — || April 12, 1996 || Steward Observatory || N. Danzl || SDOcritical || align=right | 460 km || 
|-id=182 bgcolor=#E9E9E9
| 26182 ||  || — || April 17, 1996 || La Silla || E. W. Elst || — || align=right | 3.3 km || 
|-id=183 bgcolor=#d6d6d6
| 26183 Henrigodard ||  ||  || April 17, 1996 || La Silla || E. W. Elst || KOR || align=right | 4.5 km || 
|-id=184 bgcolor=#d6d6d6
| 26184 ||  || — || April 20, 1996 || La Silla || E. W. Elst || KOR || align=right | 4.3 km || 
|-id=185 bgcolor=#d6d6d6
| 26185 || 1996 NG || — || July 14, 1996 || Haleakala || NEAT || HYG || align=right | 8.2 km || 
|-id=186 bgcolor=#d6d6d6
| 26186 ||  || — || September 20, 1996 || Kitt Peak || Spacewatch || — || align=right | 9.1 km || 
|-id=187 bgcolor=#d6d6d6
| 26187 ||  || — || December 12, 1996 || Xinglong || SCAP || TIR || align=right | 9.6 km || 
|-id=188 bgcolor=#fefefe
| 26188 Zengqingcun ||  ||  || December 22, 1996 || Xinglong || SCAP || — || align=right | 3.8 km || 
|-id=189 bgcolor=#FA8072
| 26189 ||  || — || January 10, 1997 || Oizumi || T. Kobayashi || — || align=right | 1.8 km || 
|-id=190 bgcolor=#fefefe
| 26190 ||  || — || January 30, 1997 || Oizumi || T. Kobayashi || V || align=right | 2.2 km || 
|-id=191 bgcolor=#fefefe
| 26191 ||  || — || February 3, 1997 || Oizumi || T. Kobayashi || NYS || align=right | 1.9 km || 
|-id=192 bgcolor=#fefefe
| 26192 ||  || — || February 6, 1997 || Kitt Peak || Spacewatch || EUT || align=right | 1.4 km || 
|-id=193 bgcolor=#fefefe
| 26193 ||  || — || February 12, 1997 || Oizumi || T. Kobayashi || — || align=right | 2.9 km || 
|-id=194 bgcolor=#fefefe
| 26194 Chasolivier ||  ||  || February 10, 1997 || Kitt Peak || Spacewatch || — || align=right | 1.9 km || 
|-id=195 bgcolor=#fefefe
| 26195 Černohlávek || 1997 EN ||  || March 1, 1997 || Ondřejov || P. Pravec || — || align=right | 2.2 km || 
|-id=196 bgcolor=#fefefe
| 26196 ||  || — || March 9, 1997 || Xinglong || SCAP || V || align=right | 1.8 km || 
|-id=197 bgcolor=#fefefe
| 26197 Bormio ||  ||  || March 31, 1997 || Sormano || F. Manca, P. Sicoli || — || align=right | 2.1 km || 
|-id=198 bgcolor=#fefefe
| 26198 ||  || — || April 3, 1997 || Socorro || LINEAR || NYSslow || align=right | 1.9 km || 
|-id=199 bgcolor=#fefefe
| 26199 Aileenperry ||  ||  || April 3, 1997 || Socorro || LINEAR || — || align=right | 2.7 km || 
|-id=200 bgcolor=#fefefe
| 26200 Van Doren ||  ||  || April 3, 1997 || Socorro || LINEAR || FLO || align=right | 3.4 km || 
|}

26201–26300 

|-bgcolor=#fefefe
| 26201 Sayonisaha ||  ||  || April 6, 1997 || Socorro || LINEAR || — || align=right | 2.1 km || 
|-id=202 bgcolor=#fefefe
| 26202 ||  || — || April 9, 1997 || La Silla || E. W. Elst || V || align=right | 2.7 km || 
|-id=203 bgcolor=#fefefe
| 26203 || 1997 KS || — || May 31, 1997 || Xinglong || SCAP || V || align=right | 3.2 km || 
|-id=204 bgcolor=#fefefe
| 26204 ||  || — || June 5, 1997 || Kitt Peak || Spacewatch || — || align=right | 3.0 km || 
|-id=205 bgcolor=#E9E9E9
| 26205 Kuratowski ||  ||  || June 11, 1997 || Prescott || P. G. Comba || MAR || align=right | 2.6 km || 
|-id=206 bgcolor=#E9E9E9
| 26206 ||  || — || August 11, 1997 || Bédoin || P. Antonini || — || align=right | 8.7 km || 
|-id=207 bgcolor=#E9E9E9
| 26207 || 1997 QU || — || August 25, 1997 || Lake Clear || K. A. Williams || — || align=right | 3.2 km || 
|-id=208 bgcolor=#fefefe
| 26208 ||  || — || August 28, 1997 || Dynic || A. Sugie || — || align=right | 2.4 km || 
|-id=209 bgcolor=#FA8072
| 26209 ||  || — || September 2, 1997 || Haleakala || NEAT || — || align=right | 3.0 km || 
|-id=210 bgcolor=#E9E9E9
| 26210 Lingas ||  ||  || September 6, 1997 || Pises || Pises Obs. || — || align=right | 4.1 km || 
|-id=211 bgcolor=#E9E9E9
| 26211 ||  || — || September 13, 1997 || Xinglong || SCAP || — || align=right | 8.3 km || 
|-id=212 bgcolor=#E9E9E9
| 26212 ||  || — || October 11, 1997 || Xinglong || SCAP || — || align=right | 3.8 km || 
|-id=213 bgcolor=#d6d6d6
| 26213 ||  || — || October 25, 1997 || Kitami || K. Endate, K. Watanabe || — || align=right | 6.1 km || 
|-id=214 bgcolor=#d6d6d6
| 26214 Kalinga ||  ||  || October 30, 1997 || Ondřejov || P. Pravec || — || align=right | 5.9 km || 
|-id=215 bgcolor=#d6d6d6
| 26215 ||  || — || November 4, 1997 || Dynic || A. Sugie || — || align=right | 6.7 km || 
|-id=216 bgcolor=#d6d6d6
| 26216 ||  || — || November 6, 1997 || Oizumi || T. Kobayashi || EOS || align=right | 6.8 km || 
|-id=217 bgcolor=#d6d6d6
| 26217 ||  || — || November 23, 1997 || Oizumi || T. Kobayashi || HYG || align=right | 11 km || 
|-id=218 bgcolor=#d6d6d6
| 26218 ||  || — || November 24, 1997 || Nachi-Katsuura || Y. Shimizu, T. Urata || — || align=right | 6.3 km || 
|-id=219 bgcolor=#d6d6d6
| 26219 ||  || — || November 30, 1997 || Oizumi || T. Kobayashi || TIR || align=right | 7.7 km || 
|-id=220 bgcolor=#d6d6d6
| 26220 ||  || — || November 29, 1997 || Socorro || LINEAR || — || align=right | 13 km || 
|-id=221 bgcolor=#d6d6d6
| 26221 ||  || — || November 29, 1997 || Socorro || LINEAR || EOS || align=right | 7.0 km || 
|-id=222 bgcolor=#d6d6d6
| 26222 ||  || — || November 29, 1997 || Socorro || LINEAR || EOS || align=right | 7.1 km || 
|-id=223 bgcolor=#d6d6d6
| 26223 Enari ||  ||  || December 3, 1997 || Chichibu || N. Satō || — || align=right | 5.2 km || 
|-id=224 bgcolor=#d6d6d6
| 26224 ||  || — || December 3, 1997 || Chichibu || N. Satō || — || align=right | 6.7 km || 
|-id=225 bgcolor=#E9E9E9
| 26225 ||  || — || December 24, 1997 || Xinglong || SCAP || — || align=right | 4.4 km || 
|-id=226 bgcolor=#fefefe
| 26226 ||  || — || April 4, 1998 || Woomera || F. B. Zoltowski || — || align=right | 4.5 km || 
|-id=227 bgcolor=#fefefe
| 26227 ||  || — || April 23, 1998 || Socorro || LINEAR || H || align=right | 3.0 km || 
|-id=228 bgcolor=#E9E9E9
| 26228 ||  || — || July 20, 1998 || Xinglong || SCAP || — || align=right | 4.9 km || 
|-id=229 bgcolor=#d6d6d6
| 26229 ||  || — || July 28, 1998 || Xinglong || SCAP || — || align=right | 14 km || 
|-id=230 bgcolor=#fefefe
| 26230 ||  || — || August 19, 1998 || Ondřejov || P. Pravec || V || align=right | 2.7 km || 
|-id=231 bgcolor=#fefefe
| 26231 ||  || — || August 17, 1998 || Socorro || LINEAR || — || align=right | 2.8 km || 
|-id=232 bgcolor=#fefefe
| 26232 Antink ||  ||  || August 17, 1998 || Socorro || LINEAR || NYS || align=right | 6.3 km || 
|-id=233 bgcolor=#fefefe
| 26233 Jimbraun ||  ||  || August 17, 1998 || Socorro || LINEAR || — || align=right | 3.9 km || 
|-id=234 bgcolor=#fefefe
| 26234 Leslibrinson ||  ||  || August 17, 1998 || Socorro || LINEAR || — || align=right | 3.2 km || 
|-id=235 bgcolor=#fefefe
| 26235 Annemaduggan ||  ||  || August 17, 1998 || Socorro || LINEAR || V || align=right | 1.9 km || 
|-id=236 bgcolor=#fefefe
| 26236 ||  || — || August 17, 1998 || Socorro || LINEAR || — || align=right | 2.5 km || 
|-id=237 bgcolor=#fefefe
| 26237 ||  || — || August 17, 1998 || Socorro || LINEAR || V || align=right | 2.8 km || 
|-id=238 bgcolor=#fefefe
| 26238 Elduval ||  ||  || August 17, 1998 || Socorro || LINEAR || V || align=right | 3.1 km || 
|-id=239 bgcolor=#E9E9E9
| 26239 ||  || — || August 17, 1998 || Socorro || LINEAR || — || align=right | 4.3 km || 
|-id=240 bgcolor=#fefefe
| 26240 Leigheriks ||  ||  || August 17, 1998 || Socorro || LINEAR || FLO || align=right | 2.5 km || 
|-id=241 bgcolor=#fefefe
| 26241 ||  || — || August 17, 1998 || Socorro || LINEAR || FLO || align=right | 2.7 km || 
|-id=242 bgcolor=#fefefe
| 26242 ||  || — || August 17, 1998 || Socorro || LINEAR || — || align=right | 4.2 km || 
|-id=243 bgcolor=#fefefe
| 26243 Sallyfenska ||  ||  || August 17, 1998 || Socorro || LINEAR || FLO || align=right | 2.9 km || 
|-id=244 bgcolor=#E9E9E9
| 26244 ||  || — || August 19, 1998 || Socorro || LINEAR || CLO || align=right | 7.6 km || 
|-id=245 bgcolor=#fefefe
| 26245 ||  || — || August 17, 1998 || Socorro || LINEAR || — || align=right | 3.1 km || 
|-id=246 bgcolor=#fefefe
| 26246 Mikelake ||  ||  || August 17, 1998 || Socorro || LINEAR || NYS || align=right | 5.0 km || 
|-id=247 bgcolor=#fefefe
| 26247 Doleonardi ||  ||  || August 17, 1998 || Socorro || LINEAR || — || align=right | 2.3 km || 
|-id=248 bgcolor=#fefefe
| 26248 Longenecker ||  ||  || August 17, 1998 || Socorro || LINEAR || FLO || align=right | 2.2 km || 
|-id=249 bgcolor=#fefefe
| 26249 ||  || — || August 17, 1998 || Socorro || LINEAR || — || align=right | 3.8 km || 
|-id=250 bgcolor=#fefefe
| 26250 Shaneludwig ||  ||  || August 17, 1998 || Socorro || LINEAR || — || align=right | 2.5 km || 
|-id=251 bgcolor=#fefefe
| 26251 Kiranmanne ||  ||  || August 17, 1998 || Socorro || LINEAR || FLO || align=right | 2.8 km || 
|-id=252 bgcolor=#fefefe
| 26252 Chase ||  ||  || August 27, 1998 || Anderson Mesa || LONEOS || — || align=right | 2.7 km || 
|-id=253 bgcolor=#fefefe
| 26253 ||  || — || August 29, 1998 || Višnjan Observatory || Višnjan Obs. || — || align=right | 2.2 km || 
|-id=254 bgcolor=#fefefe
| 26254 ||  || — || August 30, 1998 || Kitt Peak || Spacewatch || — || align=right | 2.9 km || 
|-id=255 bgcolor=#fefefe
| 26255 Carmarques ||  ||  || August 24, 1998 || Socorro || LINEAR || V || align=right | 1.6 km || 
|-id=256 bgcolor=#E9E9E9
| 26256 ||  || — || August 24, 1998 || Socorro || LINEAR || — || align=right | 3.2 km || 
|-id=257 bgcolor=#E9E9E9
| 26257 ||  || — || August 24, 1998 || Socorro || LINEAR || EUN || align=right | 6.2 km || 
|-id=258 bgcolor=#fefefe
| 26258 ||  || — || August 24, 1998 || Socorro || LINEAR || — || align=right | 2.2 km || 
|-id=259 bgcolor=#fefefe
| 26259 Marzigliano ||  ||  || August 17, 1998 || Socorro || LINEAR || — || align=right | 2.7 km || 
|-id=260 bgcolor=#E9E9E9
| 26260 ||  || — || September 14, 1998 || Catalina || CSS || ADE || align=right | 11 km || 
|-id=261 bgcolor=#fefefe
| 26261 Tinafreeman ||  ||  || September 14, 1998 || Anderson Mesa || LONEOS || — || align=right | 3.3 km || 
|-id=262 bgcolor=#E9E9E9
| 26262 ||  || — || September 14, 1998 || Xinglong || SCAP || — || align=right | 3.3 km || 
|-id=263 bgcolor=#fefefe
| 26263 ||  || — || September 14, 1998 || Xinglong || SCAP || — || align=right | 2.4 km || 
|-id=264 bgcolor=#fefefe
| 26264 McIntyre ||  ||  || September 14, 1998 || Socorro || LINEAR || — || align=right | 1.8 km || 
|-id=265 bgcolor=#fefefe
| 26265 ||  || — || September 14, 1998 || Socorro || LINEAR || — || align=right | 2.0 km || 
|-id=266 bgcolor=#fefefe
| 26266 Andrewmerrill ||  ||  || September 14, 1998 || Socorro || LINEAR || V || align=right | 2.4 km || 
|-id=267 bgcolor=#fefefe
| 26267 Nickmorgan ||  ||  || September 14, 1998 || Socorro || LINEAR || NYS || align=right | 2.2 km || 
|-id=268 bgcolor=#fefefe
| 26268 Nardi ||  ||  || September 14, 1998 || Socorro || LINEAR || — || align=right | 2.0 km || 
|-id=269 bgcolor=#fefefe
| 26269 Marciaprill ||  ||  || September 14, 1998 || Socorro || LINEAR || NYS || align=right | 1.9 km || 
|-id=270 bgcolor=#E9E9E9
| 26270 ||  || — || September 14, 1998 || Socorro || LINEAR || EUN || align=right | 4.2 km || 
|-id=271 bgcolor=#fefefe
| 26271 Lindapuster ||  ||  || September 14, 1998 || Socorro || LINEAR || FLO || align=right | 2.5 km || 
|-id=272 bgcolor=#fefefe
| 26272 ||  || — || September 14, 1998 || Socorro || LINEAR || FLO || align=right | 2.8 km || 
|-id=273 bgcolor=#E9E9E9
| 26273 Kateschafer ||  ||  || September 14, 1998 || Socorro || LINEAR || — || align=right | 2.5 km || 
|-id=274 bgcolor=#fefefe
| 26274 ||  || — || September 14, 1998 || Socorro || LINEAR || — || align=right | 4.5 km || 
|-id=275 bgcolor=#E9E9E9
| 26275 Jefsoulier ||  ||  || September 16, 1998 || Caussols || ODAS || — || align=right | 3.3 km || 
|-id=276 bgcolor=#fefefe
| 26276 Natrees ||  ||  || September 20, 1998 || Prescott || P. G. Comba || — || align=right | 2.4 km || 
|-id=277 bgcolor=#fefefe
| 26277 Ianrees ||  ||  || September 20, 1998 || Prescott || P. G. Comba || NYS || align=right | 2.6 km || 
|-id=278 bgcolor=#E9E9E9
| 26278 ||  || — || September 20, 1998 || Kitt Peak || Spacewatch || INO || align=right | 3.4 km || 
|-id=279 bgcolor=#fefefe
| 26279 ||  || — || September 21, 1998 || Kitt Peak || Spacewatch || — || align=right | 2.4 km || 
|-id=280 bgcolor=#E9E9E9
| 26280 ||  || — || September 20, 1998 || Woomera || F. B. Zoltowski || — || align=right | 7.8 km || 
|-id=281 bgcolor=#fefefe
| 26281 ||  || — || September 25, 1998 || Xinglong || SCAP || NYS || align=right | 2.7 km || 
|-id=282 bgcolor=#fefefe
| 26282 Noahbrosch ||  ||  || September 16, 1998 || Anderson Mesa || LONEOS || FLO || align=right | 3.6 km || 
|-id=283 bgcolor=#fefefe
| 26283 Oswalt ||  ||  || September 17, 1998 || Anderson Mesa || LONEOS || — || align=right | 3.0 km || 
|-id=284 bgcolor=#fefefe
| 26284 Johnspahn ||  ||  || September 17, 1998 || Anderson Mesa || LONEOS || V || align=right | 2.4 km || 
|-id=285 bgcolor=#E9E9E9
| 26285 Lindaspahn ||  ||  || September 17, 1998 || Anderson Mesa || LONEOS || — || align=right | 6.0 km || 
|-id=286 bgcolor=#fefefe
| 26286 ||  || — || September 20, 1998 || La Silla || E. W. Elst || — || align=right | 6.5 km || 
|-id=287 bgcolor=#fefefe
| 26287 ||  || — || September 20, 1998 || La Silla || E. W. Elst || FLO || align=right | 4.2 km || 
|-id=288 bgcolor=#fefefe
| 26288 ||  || — || September 21, 1998 || La Silla || E. W. Elst || FLO || align=right | 2.9 km || 
|-id=289 bgcolor=#E9E9E9
| 26289 ||  || — || September 21, 1998 || La Silla || E. W. Elst || — || align=right | 8.5 km || 
|-id=290 bgcolor=#fefefe
| 26290 ||  || — || September 26, 1998 || Socorro || LINEAR || — || align=right | 2.4 km || 
|-id=291 bgcolor=#fefefe
| 26291 Terristaples ||  ||  || September 26, 1998 || Socorro || LINEAR || NYS || align=right | 1.9 km || 
|-id=292 bgcolor=#E9E9E9
| 26292 ||  || — || September 26, 1998 || Socorro || LINEAR || — || align=right | 7.8 km || 
|-id=293 bgcolor=#fefefe
| 26293 Van Muyden ||  ||  || September 26, 1998 || Socorro || LINEAR || — || align=right | 3.7 km || 
|-id=294 bgcolor=#fefefe
| 26294 ||  || — || September 26, 1998 || Socorro || LINEAR || NYS || align=right | 1.7 km || 
|-id=295 bgcolor=#fefefe
| 26295 Vilardi ||  ||  || September 26, 1998 || Socorro || LINEAR || NYS || align=right | 2.0 km || 
|-id=296 bgcolor=#E9E9E9
| 26296 ||  || — || September 26, 1998 || Socorro || LINEAR || — || align=right | 5.9 km || 
|-id=297 bgcolor=#fefefe
| 26297 ||  || — || September 26, 1998 || Socorro || LINEAR || V || align=right | 3.2 km || 
|-id=298 bgcolor=#fefefe
| 26298 Dunweathers ||  ||  || September 26, 1998 || Socorro || LINEAR || FLO || align=right | 2.7 km || 
|-id=299 bgcolor=#E9E9E9
| 26299 ||  || — || September 26, 1998 || Socorro || LINEAR || — || align=right | 4.5 km || 
|-id=300 bgcolor=#E9E9E9
| 26300 Herbweiss ||  ||  || September 26, 1998 || Socorro || LINEAR || HEN || align=right | 3.3 km || 
|}

26301–26400 

|-bgcolor=#fefefe
| 26301 Hellawillis ||  ||  || September 26, 1998 || Socorro || LINEAR || NYS || align=right | 1.8 km || 
|-id=302 bgcolor=#fefefe
| 26302 Zimolzak ||  ||  || September 26, 1998 || Socorro || LINEAR || — || align=right | 2.2 km || 
|-id=303 bgcolor=#E9E9E9
| 26303 ||  || — || September 18, 1998 || La Silla || E. W. Elst || HNS || align=right | 3.4 km || 
|-id=304 bgcolor=#fefefe
| 26304 ||  || — || September 20, 1998 || La Silla || E. W. Elst || — || align=right | 2.8 km || 
|-id=305 bgcolor=#fefefe
| 26305 ||  || — || September 20, 1998 || La Silla || E. W. Elst || — || align=right | 2.7 km || 
|-id=306 bgcolor=#fefefe
| 26306 ||  || — || September 20, 1998 || La Silla || E. W. Elst || MAS || align=right | 2.6 km || 
|-id=307 bgcolor=#fefefe
| 26307 Friedafein ||  ||  || September 26, 1998 || Socorro || LINEAR || — || align=right | 2.7 km || 
|-id=308 bgcolor=#C2E0FF
| 26308 ||  || — || September 16, 1998 || Steward Observatory || N. Danzl || twotinomoon || align=right | 305 km || 
|-id=309 bgcolor=#fefefe
| 26309 || 1998 TG || — || October 10, 1998 || Oizumi || T. Kobayashi || NYS || align=right | 1.7 km || 
|-id=310 bgcolor=#FFC2E0
| 26310 ||  || — || October 14, 1998 || Kitt Peak || Spacewatch || AMO || align=right data-sort-value="0.56" | 560 m || 
|-id=311 bgcolor=#E9E9E9
| 26311 ||  || — || October 14, 1998 || Caussols || ODAS || — || align=right | 2.6 km || 
|-id=312 bgcolor=#fefefe
| 26312 Ciardi ||  ||  || October 14, 1998 || Anderson Mesa || LONEOS || — || align=right | 2.9 km || 
|-id=313 bgcolor=#fefefe
| 26313 Lorilombardi ||  ||  || October 14, 1998 || Anderson Mesa || LONEOS || — || align=right | 2.1 km || 
|-id=314 bgcolor=#E9E9E9
| 26314 Škvorecký ||  ||  || October 16, 1998 || Kleť || J. Tichá, M. Tichý || — || align=right | 2.1 km || 
|-id=315 bgcolor=#fefefe
| 26315 ||  || — || October 21, 1998 || Višnjan Observatory || K. Korlević || KLI || align=right | 5.1 km || 
|-id=316 bgcolor=#fefefe
| 26316 ||  || — || October 22, 1998 || Reedy Creek || J. Broughton || FLO || align=right | 3.6 km || 
|-id=317 bgcolor=#fefefe
| 26317 ||  || — || October 27, 1998 || Catalina || CSS || PHO || align=right | 2.9 km || 
|-id=318 bgcolor=#fefefe
| 26318 ||  || — || October 28, 1998 || Višnjan Observatory || K. Korlević || NYS || align=right | 2.1 km || 
|-id=319 bgcolor=#fefefe
| 26319 Miyauchi ||  ||  || October 26, 1998 || Nanyo || T. Okuni || V || align=right | 2.9 km || 
|-id=320 bgcolor=#E9E9E9
| 26320 ||  || — || October 18, 1998 || La Silla || E. W. Elst || NEM || align=right | 6.8 km || 
|-id=321 bgcolor=#d6d6d6
| 26321 ||  || — || November 11, 1998 || Gnosca || S. Sposetti || EUP || align=right | 10 km || 
|-id=322 bgcolor=#E9E9E9
| 26322 ||  || — || November 12, 1998 || Oizumi || T. Kobayashi || — || align=right | 4.8 km || 
|-id=323 bgcolor=#fefefe
| 26323 Wuqijin ||  ||  || November 10, 1998 || Socorro || LINEAR || V || align=right | 3.2 km || 
|-id=324 bgcolor=#d6d6d6
| 26324 ||  || — || November 10, 1998 || Socorro || LINEAR || ALA || align=right | 9.4 km || 
|-id=325 bgcolor=#d6d6d6
| 26325 ||  || — || November 10, 1998 || Socorro || LINEAR || — || align=right | 23 km || 
|-id=326 bgcolor=#fefefe
| 26326 ||  || — || November 14, 1998 || Socorro || LINEAR || NYS || align=right | 2.5 km || 
|-id=327 bgcolor=#E9E9E9
| 26327 ||  || — || November 10, 1998 || Socorro || LINEAR || — || align=right | 3.9 km || 
|-id=328 bgcolor=#fefefe
| 26328 Litomyšl || 1998 WQ ||  || November 18, 1998 || Kleť || M. Tichý, Z. Moravec || — || align=right | 5.0 km || 
|-id=329 bgcolor=#fefefe
| 26329 ||  || — || November 16, 1998 || Catalina || CSS || PHO || align=right | 4.3 km || 
|-id=330 bgcolor=#d6d6d6
| 26330 ||  || — || November 20, 1998 || Gekko || T. Kagawa || — || align=right | 6.7 km || 
|-id=331 bgcolor=#fefefe
| 26331 Kondamuri ||  ||  || November 21, 1998 || Socorro || LINEAR || V || align=right | 2.4 km || 
|-id=332 bgcolor=#E9E9E9
| 26332 Alyssehrlich ||  ||  || November 21, 1998 || Socorro || LINEAR || — || align=right | 4.1 km || 
|-id=333 bgcolor=#fefefe
| 26333 Joachim ||  ||  || November 21, 1998 || Socorro || LINEAR || FLO || align=right | 2.4 km || 
|-id=334 bgcolor=#d6d6d6
| 26334 Melimcdowell ||  ||  || November 21, 1998 || Socorro || LINEAR || KOR || align=right | 4.1 km || 
|-id=335 bgcolor=#E9E9E9
| 26335 ||  || — || November 21, 1998 || Socorro || LINEAR || — || align=right | 3.5 km || 
|-id=336 bgcolor=#E9E9E9
| 26336 Mikemcdowell ||  ||  || November 21, 1998 || Socorro || LINEAR || HEN || align=right | 7.8 km || 
|-id=337 bgcolor=#fefefe
| 26337 Matthewagam ||  ||  || November 21, 1998 || Socorro || LINEAR || NYS || align=right | 2.7 km || 
|-id=338 bgcolor=#E9E9E9
| 26338 ||  || — || November 19, 1998 || Kitt Peak || Spacewatch || — || align=right | 3.9 km || 
|-id=339 bgcolor=#E9E9E9
| 26339 ||  || — || December 9, 1998 || Oizumi || T. Kobayashi || — || align=right | 6.5 km || 
|-id=340 bgcolor=#fefefe
| 26340 Evamarková ||  ||  || December 13, 1998 || Kleť || J. Tichá, M. Tichý || — || align=right | 5.3 km || 
|-id=341 bgcolor=#E9E9E9
| 26341 ||  || — || December 9, 1998 || Višnjan Observatory || K. Korlević || — || align=right | 3.4 km || 
|-id=342 bgcolor=#E9E9E9
| 26342 ||  || — || December 14, 1998 || Socorro || LINEAR || — || align=right | 6.2 km || 
|-id=343 bgcolor=#E9E9E9
| 26343 ||  || — || December 14, 1998 || Socorro || LINEAR || EUN || align=right | 5.2 km || 
|-id=344 bgcolor=#E9E9E9
| 26344 ||  || — || December 15, 1998 || Socorro || LINEAR || — || align=right | 6.7 km || 
|-id=345 bgcolor=#fefefe
| 26345 Gedankien ||  ||  || December 15, 1998 || Socorro || LINEAR || FLO || align=right | 3.1 km || 
|-id=346 bgcolor=#d6d6d6
| 26346 ||  || — || December 15, 1998 || Socorro || LINEAR || EOS || align=right | 9.6 km || 
|-id=347 bgcolor=#E9E9E9
| 26347 ||  || — || December 15, 1998 || Socorro || LINEAR || ADE || align=right | 4.5 km || 
|-id=348 bgcolor=#E9E9E9
| 26348 ||  || — || December 15, 1998 || Socorro || LINEAR || MAR || align=right | 6.4 km || 
|-id=349 bgcolor=#d6d6d6
| 26349 ||  || — || December 15, 1998 || Socorro || LINEAR || — || align=right | 13 km || 
|-id=350 bgcolor=#d6d6d6
| 26350 ||  || — || December 15, 1998 || Socorro || LINEAR || EOS || align=right | 5.5 km || 
|-id=351 bgcolor=#E9E9E9
| 26351 ||  || — || December 15, 1998 || Socorro || LINEAR || — || align=right | 5.4 km || 
|-id=352 bgcolor=#E9E9E9
| 26352 ||  || — || December 15, 1998 || Socorro || LINEAR || — || align=right | 11 km || 
|-id=353 bgcolor=#E9E9E9
| 26353 || 1998 YP || — || December 16, 1998 || Oizumi || T. Kobayashi || MAR || align=right | 6.1 km || 
|-id=354 bgcolor=#d6d6d6
| 26354 ||  || — || December 16, 1998 || Woomera || F. B. Zoltowski || — || align=right | 13 km || 
|-id=355 bgcolor=#E9E9E9
| 26355 Grueber ||  ||  || December 23, 1998 || Linz || E. Meyer || — || align=right | 5.6 km || 
|-id=356 bgcolor=#E9E9E9
| 26356 Aventini ||  ||  || December 26, 1998 || San Marcello || L. Tesi, A. Boattini || — || align=right | 6.5 km || 
|-id=357 bgcolor=#E9E9E9
| 26357 Laguerre ||  ||  || December 27, 1998 || Prescott || P. G. Comba || EUN || align=right | 4.3 km || 
|-id=358 bgcolor=#E9E9E9
| 26358 ||  || — || December 26, 1998 || Oizumi || T. Kobayashi || — || align=right | 3.0 km || 
|-id=359 bgcolor=#d6d6d6
| 26359 ||  || — || December 27, 1998 || Oizumi || T. Kobayashi || EOS || align=right | 9.9 km || 
|-id=360 bgcolor=#E9E9E9
| 26360 ||  || — || December 17, 1998 || Kitt Peak || Spacewatch || — || align=right | 4.8 km || 
|-id=361 bgcolor=#E9E9E9
| 26361 ||  || — || January 10, 1999 || Nachi-Katsuura || Y. Shimizu, T. Urata || — || align=right | 6.1 km || 
|-id=362 bgcolor=#E9E9E9
| 26362 ||  || — || January 7, 1999 || Socorro || LINEAR || — || align=right | 5.1 km || 
|-id=363 bgcolor=#E9E9E9
| 26363 ||  || — || January 8, 1999 || Socorro || LINEAR || — || align=right | 9.5 km || 
|-id=364 bgcolor=#d6d6d6
| 26364 ||  || — || January 13, 1999 || Oizumi || T. Kobayashi || URS || align=right | 15 km || 
|-id=365 bgcolor=#E9E9E9
| 26365 ||  || — || January 14, 1999 || Višnjan Observatory || K. Korlević || — || align=right | 5.5 km || 
|-id=366 bgcolor=#fefefe
| 26366 ||  || — || January 14, 1999 || Višnjan Observatory || K. Korlević || NYS || align=right | 3.4 km || 
|-id=367 bgcolor=#fefefe
| 26367 ||  || — || February 2, 1999 || Dynic || A. Sugie || — || align=right | 7.6 km || 
|-id=368 bgcolor=#fefefe
| 26368 Alghunaim ||  ||  || February 10, 1999 || Socorro || LINEAR || — || align=right | 8.3 km || 
|-id=369 bgcolor=#d6d6d6
| 26369 ||  || — || February 12, 1999 || Socorro || LINEAR || — || align=right | 24 km || 
|-id=370 bgcolor=#d6d6d6
| 26370 ||  || — || February 12, 1999 || Socorro || LINEAR || EOS || align=right | 9.8 km || 
|-id=371 bgcolor=#d6d6d6
| 26371 ||  || — || February 12, 1999 || Socorro || LINEAR || MEL || align=right | 13 km || 
|-id=372 bgcolor=#E9E9E9
| 26372 ||  || — || February 12, 1999 || Socorro || LINEAR || — || align=right | 4.8 km || 
|-id=373 bgcolor=#d6d6d6
| 26373 ||  || — || February 12, 1999 || Socorro || LINEAR || — || align=right | 9.6 km || 
|-id=374 bgcolor=#E9E9E9
| 26374 ||  || — || February 12, 1999 || Socorro || LINEAR || — || align=right | 4.4 km || 
|-id=375 bgcolor=#C2E0FF
| 26375 ||  || — || February 20, 1999 || Kitt Peak || C. Trujillo, J. X. Luu || res2:5critical || align=right | 455 km || 
|-id=376 bgcolor=#E9E9E9
| 26376 Roborosa ||  ||  || March 11, 1999 || Ondřejov || P. Pravec || — || align=right | 4.0 km || 
|-id=377 bgcolor=#d6d6d6
| 26377 ||  || — || March 16, 1999 || Kitt Peak || Spacewatch || — || align=right | 7.6 km || 
|-id=378 bgcolor=#d6d6d6
| 26378 ||  || — || April 6, 1999 || Socorro || LINEAR || — || align=right | 8.9 km || 
|-id=379 bgcolor=#FFC2E0
| 26379 ||  || — || April 20, 1999 || Socorro || LINEAR || APO +1kmcritical || align=right data-sort-value="0.89" | 890 m || 
|-id=380 bgcolor=#E9E9E9
| 26380 ||  || — || May 12, 1999 || Socorro || LINEAR || — || align=right | 12 km || 
|-id=381 bgcolor=#E9E9E9
| 26381 ||  || — || May 18, 1999 || Socorro || LINEAR || — || align=right | 6.7 km || 
|-id=382 bgcolor=#d6d6d6
| 26382 Charlieduke ||  ||  || June 8, 1999 || Anderson Mesa || LONEOS || ALA || align=right | 23 km || 
|-id=383 bgcolor=#fefefe
| 26383 ||  || — || June 20, 1999 || Catalina || CSS || H || align=right | 1.8 km || 
|-id=384 bgcolor=#fefefe
| 26384 ||  || — || August 31, 1999 || Xinglong || SCAP || — || align=right | 4.5 km || 
|-id=385 bgcolor=#FA8072
| 26385 ||  || — || September 7, 1999 || Socorro || LINEAR || — || align=right | 1.9 km || 
|-id=386 bgcolor=#fefefe
| 26386 Adelinacozma ||  ||  || September 9, 1999 || Socorro || LINEAR || FLO || align=right | 2.0 km || 
|-id=387 bgcolor=#E9E9E9
| 26387 ||  || — || October 2, 1999 || Fountain Hills || C. W. Juels || GEF || align=right | 7.2 km || 
|-id=388 bgcolor=#E9E9E9
| 26388 ||  || — || October 3, 1999 || Socorro || LINEAR || — || align=right | 2.9 km || 
|-id=389 bgcolor=#E9E9E9
| 26389 Poojarambhia ||  ||  || October 7, 1999 || Socorro || LINEAR || — || align=right | 5.5 km || 
|-id=390 bgcolor=#E9E9E9
| 26390 Rušin ||  ||  || October 19, 1999 || Ondřejov || P. Kušnirák || MAR || align=right | 3.5 km || 
|-id=391 bgcolor=#fefefe
| 26391 ||  || — || November 8, 1999 || Višnjan Observatory || K. Korlević || FLO || align=right | 4.4 km || 
|-id=392 bgcolor=#fefefe
| 26392 ||  || — || November 9, 1999 || Oizumi || T. Kobayashi || FLO || align=right | 2.3 km || 
|-id=393 bgcolor=#fefefe
| 26393 Scaffa ||  ||  || November 3, 1999 || Socorro || LINEAR || — || align=right | 1.9 km || 
|-id=394 bgcolor=#fefefe
| 26394 Kandola ||  ||  || November 3, 1999 || Socorro || LINEAR || SUL || align=right | 6.8 km || 
|-id=395 bgcolor=#fefefe
| 26395 Megkurohara ||  ||  || November 14, 1999 || Socorro || LINEAR || NYS || align=right | 1.6 km || 
|-id=396 bgcolor=#E9E9E9
| 26396 Chengjingjie ||  ||  || November 14, 1999 || Socorro || LINEAR || — || align=right | 6.0 km || 
|-id=397 bgcolor=#fefefe
| 26397 Carolynsinow ||  ||  || November 15, 1999 || Socorro || LINEAR || ERI || align=right | 6.2 km || 
|-id=398 bgcolor=#fefefe
| 26398 ||  || — || November 15, 1999 || Socorro || LINEAR || NYS || align=right | 5.2 km || 
|-id=399 bgcolor=#fefefe
| 26399 Rileyennis ||  ||  || November 15, 1999 || Socorro || LINEAR || — || align=right | 2.2 km || 
|-id=400 bgcolor=#fefefe
| 26400 Roshanpalli ||  ||  || November 15, 1999 || Socorro || LINEAR || FLO || align=right | 1.8 km || 
|}

26401–26500 

|-bgcolor=#fefefe
| 26401 Sobotište || 1999 WX ||  || November 19, 1999 || Ondřejov || P. Kušnirák || V || align=right | 2.3 km || 
|-id=402 bgcolor=#fefefe
| 26402 ||  || — || November 28, 1999 || Oizumi || T. Kobayashi || NYS || align=right | 2.2 km || 
|-id=403 bgcolor=#E9E9E9
| 26403 ||  || — || November 30, 1999 || Socorro || LINEAR || EUN || align=right | 5.3 km || 
|-id=404 bgcolor=#fefefe
| 26404 ||  || — || December 2, 1999 || Oizumi || T. Kobayashi || — || align=right | 3.8 km || 
|-id=405 bgcolor=#d6d6d6
| 26405 ||  || — || December 5, 1999 || Višnjan Observatory || K. Korlević || — || align=right | 6.0 km || 
|-id=406 bgcolor=#E9E9E9
| 26406 ||  || — || December 5, 1999 || Socorro || LINEAR || — || align=right | 8.0 km || 
|-id=407 bgcolor=#fefefe
| 26407 ||  || — || December 6, 1999 || Socorro || LINEAR || — || align=right | 3.2 km || 
|-id=408 bgcolor=#E9E9E9
| 26408 ||  || — || December 6, 1999 || Socorro || LINEAR || — || align=right | 4.8 km || 
|-id=409 bgcolor=#fefefe
| 26409 ||  || — || December 6, 1999 || Socorro || LINEAR || — || align=right | 2.9 km || 
|-id=410 bgcolor=#d6d6d6
| 26410 ||  || — || December 6, 1999 || Socorro || LINEAR || — || align=right | 7.6 km || 
|-id=411 bgcolor=#fefefe
| 26411 Jocorbferg ||  ||  || December 6, 1999 || Socorro || LINEAR || — || align=right | 3.1 km || 
|-id=412 bgcolor=#E9E9E9
| 26412 Charlesyu ||  ||  || December 7, 1999 || Socorro || LINEAR || — || align=right | 4.5 km || 
|-id=413 bgcolor=#fefefe
| 26413 ||  || — || December 7, 1999 || Socorro || LINEAR || FLO || align=right | 1.7 km || 
|-id=414 bgcolor=#fefefe
| 26414 Amychyao ||  ||  || December 7, 1999 || Socorro || LINEAR || — || align=right | 3.1 km || 
|-id=415 bgcolor=#E9E9E9
| 26415 ||  || — || December 7, 1999 || Socorro || LINEAR || — || align=right | 3.7 km || 
|-id=416 bgcolor=#fefefe
| 26416 ||  || — || December 7, 1999 || Socorro || LINEAR || moon || align=right | 3.9 km || 
|-id=417 bgcolor=#fefefe
| 26417 Michaelgord ||  ||  || December 7, 1999 || Socorro || LINEAR || V || align=right | 2.3 km || 
|-id=418 bgcolor=#E9E9E9
| 26418 ||  || — || December 7, 1999 || Socorro || LINEAR || ADE || align=right | 7.2 km || 
|-id=419 bgcolor=#E9E9E9
| 26419 ||  || — || December 7, 1999 || Oizumi || T. Kobayashi || EUN || align=right | 5.5 km || 
|-id=420 bgcolor=#fefefe
| 26420 ||  || — || December 7, 1999 || Socorro || LINEAR || moon || align=right | 2.1 km || 
|-id=421 bgcolor=#E9E9E9
| 26421 ||  || — || December 11, 1999 || Socorro || LINEAR || EUN || align=right | 5.5 km || 
|-id=422 bgcolor=#fefefe
| 26422 Marekbuchman ||  ||  || December 12, 1999 || Socorro || LINEAR || — || align=right | 5.1 km || 
|-id=423 bgcolor=#fefefe
| 26423 ||  || — || December 2, 1999 || Kitt Peak || Spacewatch || — || align=right | 2.2 km || 
|-id=424 bgcolor=#fefefe
| 26424 Jacquelihung ||  ||  || December 7, 1999 || Socorro || LINEAR || — || align=right | 2.3 km || 
|-id=425 bgcolor=#fefefe
| 26425 Linchichieh ||  ||  || December 8, 1999 || Socorro || LINEAR || — || align=right | 2.5 km || 
|-id=426 bgcolor=#fefefe
| 26426 Koechl ||  ||  || December 8, 1999 || Socorro || LINEAR || — || align=right | 2.8 km || 
|-id=427 bgcolor=#E9E9E9
| 26427 ||  || — || December 8, 1999 || Socorro || LINEAR || — || align=right | 4.7 km || 
|-id=428 bgcolor=#fefefe
| 26428 ||  || — || December 10, 1999 || Socorro || LINEAR || — || align=right | 7.0 km || 
|-id=429 bgcolor=#E9E9E9
| 26429 Andiwagner ||  ||  || December 10, 1999 || Socorro || LINEAR || — || align=right | 4.5 km || 
|-id=430 bgcolor=#E9E9E9
| 26430 Thomwilkason ||  ||  || December 10, 1999 || Socorro || LINEAR || — || align=right | 3.4 km || 
|-id=431 bgcolor=#fefefe
| 26431 ||  || — || December 12, 1999 || Socorro || LINEAR || — || align=right | 2.7 km || 
|-id=432 bgcolor=#E9E9E9
| 26432 ||  || — || December 12, 1999 || Socorro || LINEAR || EUN || align=right | 5.6 km || 
|-id=433 bgcolor=#fefefe
| 26433 Michaelyurko ||  ||  || December 14, 1999 || Socorro || LINEAR || — || align=right | 2.6 km || 
|-id=434 bgcolor=#d6d6d6
| 26434 ||  || — || December 13, 1999 || Kitt Peak || Spacewatch || — || align=right | 5.9 km || 
|-id=435 bgcolor=#fefefe
| 26435 Juliebrisset ||  ||  || December 13, 1999 || Anderson Mesa || LONEOS || — || align=right | 4.7 km || 
|-id=436 bgcolor=#fefefe
| 26436 ||  || — || December 28, 1999 || Farpoint || G. Hug, G. Bell || NYS || align=right | 2.6 km || 
|-id=437 bgcolor=#fefefe
| 26437 ||  || — || December 27, 1999 || Kitt Peak || Spacewatch || FLO || align=right | 3.0 km || 
|-id=438 bgcolor=#fefefe
| 26438 Durling ||  ||  || December 30, 1999 || Anderson Mesa || LONEOS || — || align=right | 2.4 km || 
|-id=439 bgcolor=#fefefe
| 26439 ||  || — || January 2, 2000 || Višnjan Observatory || K. Korlević || — || align=right | 4.5 km || 
|-id=440 bgcolor=#E9E9E9
| 26440 ||  || — || January 3, 2000 || Socorro || LINEAR || — || align=right | 7.1 km || 
|-id=441 bgcolor=#d6d6d6
| 26441 Nanayakkara ||  ||  || January 3, 2000 || Socorro || LINEAR || — || align=right | 7.7 km || 
|-id=442 bgcolor=#E9E9E9
| 26442 Matfernandez ||  ||  || January 3, 2000 || Socorro || LINEAR || — || align=right | 4.1 km || 
|-id=443 bgcolor=#E9E9E9
| 26443 ||  || — || January 5, 2000 || Fountain Hills || C. W. Juels || ADE || align=right | 9.7 km || 
|-id=444 bgcolor=#E9E9E9
| 26444 ||  || — || January 4, 2000 || Socorro || LINEAR || — || align=right | 7.6 km || 
|-id=445 bgcolor=#E9E9E9
| 26445 ||  || — || January 4, 2000 || Socorro || LINEAR || — || align=right | 9.0 km || 
|-id=446 bgcolor=#E9E9E9
| 26446 ||  || — || January 4, 2000 || Socorro || LINEAR || — || align=right | 7.7 km || 
|-id=447 bgcolor=#fefefe
| 26447 Akrishnan ||  ||  || January 4, 2000 || Socorro || LINEAR || NYSslow || align=right | 2.3 km || 
|-id=448 bgcolor=#fefefe
| 26448 Tongjili ||  ||  || January 5, 2000 || Socorro || LINEAR || — || align=right | 3.2 km || 
|-id=449 bgcolor=#fefefe
| 26449 ||  || — || January 5, 2000 || Socorro || LINEAR || V || align=right | 3.5 km || 
|-id=450 bgcolor=#fefefe
| 26450 Tanyapetach ||  ||  || January 5, 2000 || Socorro || LINEAR || — || align=right | 3.8 km || 
|-id=451 bgcolor=#fefefe
| 26451 Khweis ||  ||  || January 5, 2000 || Socorro || LINEAR || — || align=right | 2.4 km || 
|-id=452 bgcolor=#fefefe
| 26452 ||  || — || January 5, 2000 || Socorro || LINEAR || — || align=right | 2.4 km || 
|-id=453 bgcolor=#fefefe
| 26453 ||  || — || January 5, 2000 || Socorro || LINEAR || — || align=right | 2.7 km || 
|-id=454 bgcolor=#fefefe
| 26454 ||  || — || January 5, 2000 || Socorro || LINEAR || V || align=right | 3.2 km || 
|-id=455 bgcolor=#E9E9E9
| 26455 Priyamshah ||  ||  || January 4, 2000 || Socorro || LINEAR || — || align=right | 4.7 km || 
|-id=456 bgcolor=#fefefe
| 26456 ||  || — || January 5, 2000 || Socorro || LINEAR || — || align=right | 6.2 km || 
|-id=457 bgcolor=#fefefe
| 26457 Naomishah ||  ||  || January 5, 2000 || Socorro || LINEAR || — || align=right | 2.3 km || 
|-id=458 bgcolor=#fefefe
| 26458 Choihyuna ||  ||  || January 5, 2000 || Socorro || LINEAR || — || align=right | 2.4 km || 
|-id=459 bgcolor=#fefefe
| 26459 Shinsubin ||  ||  || January 5, 2000 || Socorro || LINEAR || V || align=right | 1.7 km || 
|-id=460 bgcolor=#E9E9E9
| 26460 ||  || — || January 5, 2000 || Socorro || LINEAR || — || align=right | 5.5 km || 
|-id=461 bgcolor=#E9E9E9
| 26461 ||  || — || January 5, 2000 || Socorro || LINEAR || — || align=right | 5.0 km || 
|-id=462 bgcolor=#fefefe
| 26462 Albertcui ||  ||  || January 5, 2000 || Socorro || LINEAR || V || align=right | 3.2 km || 
|-id=463 bgcolor=#E9E9E9
| 26463 ||  || — || January 4, 2000 || Socorro || LINEAR || MAR || align=right | 5.2 km || 
|-id=464 bgcolor=#E9E9E9
| 26464 ||  || — || January 4, 2000 || Socorro || LINEAR || DOR || align=right | 7.7 km || 
|-id=465 bgcolor=#E9E9E9
| 26465 ||  || — || January 5, 2000 || Socorro || LINEAR || — || align=right | 4.9 km || 
|-id=466 bgcolor=#fefefe
| 26466 Zarrin ||  ||  || January 5, 2000 || Socorro || LINEAR || — || align=right | 2.9 km || 
|-id=467 bgcolor=#fefefe
| 26467 Jamespopper ||  ||  || January 5, 2000 || Socorro || LINEAR || V || align=right | 3.1 km || 
|-id=468 bgcolor=#fefefe
| 26468 Ianchan ||  ||  || January 5, 2000 || Socorro || LINEAR || — || align=right | 2.6 km || 
|-id=469 bgcolor=#E9E9E9
| 26469 ||  || — || January 5, 2000 || Socorro || LINEAR || — || align=right | 5.5 km || 
|-id=470 bgcolor=#E9E9E9
| 26470 ||  || — || January 8, 2000 || Socorro || LINEAR || — || align=right | 3.5 km || 
|-id=471 bgcolor=#FA8072
| 26471 Tracybecker ||  ||  || January 8, 2000 || Socorro || LINEAR || Hmoon || align=right | 5.0 km || 
|-id=472 bgcolor=#fefefe
| 26472 ||  || — || January 4, 2000 || Socorro || LINEAR || — || align=right | 6.7 km || 
|-id=473 bgcolor=#E9E9E9
| 26473 ||  || — || January 7, 2000 || Socorro || LINEAR || EUN || align=right | 4.8 km || 
|-id=474 bgcolor=#fefefe
| 26474 Davidsimon ||  ||  || January 7, 2000 || Socorro || LINEAR || — || align=right | 4.6 km || 
|-id=475 bgcolor=#fefefe
| 26475 Krisztisugar ||  ||  || January 7, 2000 || Socorro || LINEAR || V || align=right | 2.9 km || 
|-id=476 bgcolor=#E9E9E9
| 26476 ||  || — || January 7, 2000 || Socorro || LINEAR || — || align=right | 4.2 km || 
|-id=477 bgcolor=#fefefe
| 26477 ||  || — || January 8, 2000 || Socorro || LINEAR || — || align=right | 4.9 km || 
|-id=478 bgcolor=#E9E9E9
| 26478 Cristianrosu ||  ||  || January 8, 2000 || Socorro || LINEAR || GEF || align=right | 4.8 km || 
|-id=479 bgcolor=#E9E9E9
| 26479 ||  || — || January 8, 2000 || Socorro || LINEAR || — || align=right | 5.5 km || 
|-id=480 bgcolor=#d6d6d6
| 26480 ||  || — || January 8, 2000 || Socorro || LINEAR || — || align=right | 5.7 km || 
|-id=481 bgcolor=#E9E9E9
| 26481 ||  || — || January 9, 2000 || Socorro || LINEAR || EUN || align=right | 4.4 km || 
|-id=482 bgcolor=#d6d6d6
| 26482 ||  || — || January 10, 2000 || Socorro || LINEAR || — || align=right | 22 km || 
|-id=483 bgcolor=#fefefe
| 26483 ||  || — || January 10, 2000 || Socorro || LINEAR || — || align=right | 11 km || 
|-id=484 bgcolor=#d6d6d6
| 26484 ||  || — || January 7, 2000 || Kitt Peak || Spacewatch || — || align=right | 8.1 km || 
|-id=485 bgcolor=#d6d6d6
| 26485 Edwinpost ||  ||  || January 4, 2000 || Anderson Mesa || LONEOS || — || align=right | 6.7 km || 
|-id=486 bgcolor=#C2FFFF
| 26486 ||  || — || January 4, 2000 || Socorro || LINEAR || L4 || align=right | 14 km || 
|-id=487 bgcolor=#fefefe
| 26487 ||  || — || January 5, 2000 || Socorro || LINEAR || V || align=right | 4.0 km || 
|-id=488 bgcolor=#d6d6d6
| 26488 Beiser ||  ||  || January 7, 2000 || Anderson Mesa || LONEOS || — || align=right | 5.2 km || 
|-id=489 bgcolor=#d6d6d6
| 26489 ||  || — || January 7, 2000 || Socorro || LINEAR || — || align=right | 7.4 km || 
|-id=490 bgcolor=#E9E9E9
| 26490 ||  || — || January 10, 2000 || Socorro || LINEAR || EUN || align=right | 3.6 km || 
|-id=491 bgcolor=#E9E9E9
| 26491 ||  || — || January 27, 2000 || Oizumi || T. Kobayashi || — || align=right | 10 km || 
|-id=492 bgcolor=#d6d6d6
| 26492 ||  || — || January 28, 2000 || Kitt Peak || Spacewatch || — || align=right | 4.8 km || 
|-id=493 bgcolor=#fefefe
| 26493 Paulsucala ||  ||  || January 30, 2000 || Socorro || LINEAR || NYS || align=right | 2.2 km || 
|-id=494 bgcolor=#E9E9E9
| 26494 ||  || — || January 26, 2000 || Višnjan Observatory || K. Korlević || — || align=right | 3.2 km || 
|-id=495 bgcolor=#fefefe
| 26495 Eichorn ||  ||  || January 30, 2000 || Catalina || CSS || V || align=right | 2.4 km || 
|-id=496 bgcolor=#fefefe
| 26496 ||  || — || February 4, 2000 || Višnjan Observatory || K. Korlević || V || align=right | 3.0 km || 
|-id=497 bgcolor=#d6d6d6
| 26497 ||  || — || February 3, 2000 || San Marcello || A. Boattini, G. Forti || — || align=right | 8.5 km || 
|-id=498 bgcolor=#d6d6d6
| 26498 Dinotina ||  ||  || February 4, 2000 || Pian dei Termini || A. Boattini, L. Tesi || — || align=right | 10 km || 
|-id=499 bgcolor=#E9E9E9
| 26499 Robertazabotti ||  ||  || February 4, 2000 || San Marcello || A. Boattini, M. Tombelli || — || align=right | 11 km || 
|-id=500 bgcolor=#E9E9E9
| 26500 Toshiohino ||  ||  || February 2, 2000 || Oizumi || T. Kobayashi || — || align=right | 6.9 km || 
|}

26501–26600 

|-bgcolor=#E9E9E9
| 26501 Sachiko ||  ||  || February 2, 2000 || Oizumi || T. Kobayashi || EUN || align=right | 5.4 km || 
|-id=502 bgcolor=#fefefe
| 26502 Traviscole ||  ||  || February 2, 2000 || Socorro || LINEAR || — || align=right | 2.7 km || 
|-id=503 bgcolor=#fefefe
| 26503 Avicramer ||  ||  || February 2, 2000 || Socorro || LINEAR || — || align=right | 3.3 km || 
|-id=504 bgcolor=#fefefe
| 26504 Brandonli ||  ||  || February 2, 2000 || Socorro || LINEAR || FLO || align=right | 3.1 km || 
|-id=505 bgcolor=#fefefe
| 26505 Olextokarev ||  ||  || February 2, 2000 || Socorro || LINEAR || — || align=right | 2.5 km || 
|-id=506 bgcolor=#d6d6d6
| 26506 ||  || — || February 2, 2000 || Socorro || LINEAR || NAE || align=right | 8.4 km || 
|-id=507 bgcolor=#E9E9E9
| 26507 Mikelin ||  ||  || February 2, 2000 || Socorro || LINEAR || — || align=right | 5.4 km || 
|-id=508 bgcolor=#fefefe
| 26508 Jimmylin ||  ||  || February 2, 2000 || Socorro || LINEAR || NYS || align=right | 1.9 km || 
|-id=509 bgcolor=#fefefe
| 26509 ||  || — || February 5, 2000 || Višnjan Observatory || K. Korlević || NYS || align=right | 3.4 km || 
|-id=510 bgcolor=#C2FFFF
| 26510 ||  || — || February 2, 2000 || Socorro || LINEAR || L4 || align=right | 14 km || 
|-id=511 bgcolor=#E9E9E9
| 26511 ||  || — || February 3, 2000 || Socorro || LINEAR || GEF || align=right | 4.7 km || 
|-id=512 bgcolor=#d6d6d6
| 26512 ||  || — || February 2, 2000 || Socorro || LINEAR || — || align=right | 6.5 km || 
|-id=513 bgcolor=#fefefe
| 26513 Newberry ||  ||  || February 2, 2000 || Socorro || LINEAR || V || align=right | 1.9 km || 
|-id=514 bgcolor=#E9E9E9
| 26514 ||  || — || February 2, 2000 || Socorro || LINEAR || — || align=right | 7.2 km || 
|-id=515 bgcolor=#d6d6d6
| 26515 ||  || — || February 2, 2000 || Socorro || LINEAR || — || align=right | 6.6 km || 
|-id=516 bgcolor=#d6d6d6
| 26516 ||  || — || February 4, 2000 || Socorro || LINEAR || LIX || align=right | 14 km || 
|-id=517 bgcolor=#fefefe
| 26517 ||  || — || February 2, 2000 || Socorro || LINEAR || — || align=right | 3.2 km || 
|-id=518 bgcolor=#d6d6d6
| 26518 Bhuiyan ||  ||  || February 4, 2000 || Socorro || LINEAR || THM || align=right | 7.0 km || 
|-id=519 bgcolor=#d6d6d6
| 26519 ||  || — || February 7, 2000 || Socorro || LINEAR || VER || align=right | 9.6 km || 
|-id=520 bgcolor=#E9E9E9
| 26520 ||  || — || February 6, 2000 || Socorro || LINEAR || — || align=right | 8.1 km || 
|-id=521 bgcolor=#d6d6d6
| 26521 ||  || — || February 10, 2000 || Višnjan Observatory || K. Korlević || — || align=right | 10 km || 
|-id=522 bgcolor=#d6d6d6
| 26522 Juliapoje ||  ||  || February 4, 2000 || Socorro || LINEAR || — || align=right | 9.1 km || 
|-id=523 bgcolor=#d6d6d6
| 26523 ||  || — || February 4, 2000 || Socorro || LINEAR || — || align=right | 9.3 km || 
|-id=524 bgcolor=#fefefe
| 26524 ||  || — || February 4, 2000 || Socorro || LINEAR || — || align=right | 3.8 km || 
|-id=525 bgcolor=#d6d6d6
| 26525 ||  || — || February 4, 2000 || Socorro || LINEAR || THM || align=right | 7.5 km || 
|-id=526 bgcolor=#fefefe
| 26526 Jookayhyun ||  ||  || February 4, 2000 || Socorro || LINEAR || — || align=right | 4.4 km || 
|-id=527 bgcolor=#E9E9E9
| 26527 Leasure ||  ||  || February 4, 2000 || Socorro || LINEAR || — || align=right | 5.3 km || 
|-id=528 bgcolor=#d6d6d6
| 26528 Genniferubin ||  ||  || February 6, 2000 || Socorro || LINEAR || THM || align=right | 9.4 km || 
|-id=529 bgcolor=#E9E9E9
| 26529 ||  || — || February 8, 2000 || Socorro || LINEAR || — || align=right | 4.7 km || 
|-id=530 bgcolor=#E9E9E9
| 26530 Lucferreira ||  ||  || February 6, 2000 || Socorro || LINEAR || — || align=right | 5.1 km || 
|-id=531 bgcolor=#d6d6d6
| 26531 ||  || — || February 10, 2000 || Kitt Peak || Spacewatch || KOR || align=right | 3.8 km || 
|-id=532 bgcolor=#E9E9E9
| 26532 Eduardoboff ||  ||  || February 6, 2000 || Socorro || LINEAR || — || align=right | 8.0 km || 
|-id=533 bgcolor=#E9E9E9
| 26533 Aldering ||  ||  || February 5, 2000 || Catalina || CSS || — || align=right | 3.0 km || 
|-id=534 bgcolor=#fefefe
| 26534 || 2000 DA || — || February 16, 2000 || Socorro || LINEAR || — || align=right | 5.4 km || 
|-id=535 bgcolor=#E9E9E9
| 26535 ||  || — || February 27, 2000 || Oizumi || T. Kobayashi || — || align=right | 5.8 km || 
|-id=536 bgcolor=#d6d6d6
| 26536 ||  || — || February 27, 2000 || Višnjan Observatory || K. Korlević, M. Jurić || — || align=right | 8.7 km || 
|-id=537 bgcolor=#fefefe
| 26537 Shyamalbuch ||  ||  || February 28, 2000 || Socorro || LINEAR || — || align=right | 3.0 km || 
|-id=538 bgcolor=#E9E9E9
| 26538 ||  || — || February 29, 2000 || Oizumi || T. Kobayashi || — || align=right | 5.4 km || 
|-id=539 bgcolor=#fefefe
| 26539 ||  || — || February 26, 2000 || Kitt Peak || Spacewatch || NYS || align=right | 2.6 km || 
|-id=540 bgcolor=#E9E9E9
| 26540 ||  || — || February 28, 2000 || Kitt Peak || Spacewatch || — || align=right | 9.4 km || 
|-id=541 bgcolor=#d6d6d6
| 26541 Garyross ||  ||  || February 27, 2000 || Catalina || CSS || — || align=right | 6.2 km || 
|-id=542 bgcolor=#fefefe
| 26542 ||  || — || February 29, 2000 || Socorro || LINEAR || — || align=right | 2.2 km || 
|-id=543 bgcolor=#fefefe
| 26543 ||  || — || February 29, 2000 || Socorro || LINEAR || — || align=right | 2.9 km || 
|-id=544 bgcolor=#E9E9E9
| 26544 Ajjarapu ||  ||  || February 29, 2000 || Socorro || LINEAR || — || align=right | 3.9 km || 
|-id=545 bgcolor=#E9E9E9
| 26545 Meganperkins ||  ||  || February 29, 2000 || Socorro || LINEAR || — || align=right | 2.4 km || 
|-id=546 bgcolor=#d6d6d6
| 26546 Arulmani ||  ||  || February 29, 2000 || Socorro || LINEAR || — || align=right | 5.9 km || 
|-id=547 bgcolor=#E9E9E9
| 26547 ||  || — || February 29, 2000 || Socorro || LINEAR || — || align=right | 5.9 km || 
|-id=548 bgcolor=#d6d6d6
| 26548 Joykutty ||  ||  || February 29, 2000 || Socorro || LINEAR || — || align=right | 7.1 km || 
|-id=549 bgcolor=#fefefe
| 26549 Tankanran ||  ||  || February 29, 2000 || Socorro || LINEAR || FLO || align=right | 3.1 km || 
|-id=550 bgcolor=#d6d6d6
| 26550 ||  || — || February 29, 2000 || Socorro || LINEAR || HYG || align=right | 8.8 km || 
|-id=551 bgcolor=#E9E9E9
| 26551 Shenliangbo ||  ||  || February 29, 2000 || Socorro || LINEAR || — || align=right | 3.0 km || 
|-id=552 bgcolor=#E9E9E9
| 26552 ||  || — || February 29, 2000 || Socorro || LINEAR || KRM || align=right | 7.8 km || 
|-id=553 bgcolor=#d6d6d6
| 26553 ||  || — || February 29, 2000 || Socorro || LINEAR || 7:4 || align=right | 5.9 km || 
|-id=554 bgcolor=#fefefe
| 26554 ||  || — || February 28, 2000 || Socorro || LINEAR || — || align=right | 3.0 km || 
|-id=555 bgcolor=#d6d6d6
| 26555 ||  || — || February 29, 2000 || Socorro || LINEAR || — || align=right | 9.8 km || 
|-id=556 bgcolor=#E9E9E9
| 26556 ||  || — || February 29, 2000 || Socorro || LINEAR || — || align=right | 4.3 km || 
|-id=557 bgcolor=#E9E9E9
| 26557 Aakritijain ||  ||  || February 28, 2000 || Socorro || LINEAR || — || align=right | 3.3 km || 
|-id=558 bgcolor=#d6d6d6
| 26558 ||  || — || March 4, 2000 || Socorro || LINEAR || — || align=right | 9.9 km || 
|-id=559 bgcolor=#fefefe
| 26559 Chengcheng ||  ||  || March 5, 2000 || Socorro || LINEAR || V || align=right | 2.2 km || 
|-id=560 bgcolor=#fefefe
| 26560 ||  || — || March 8, 2000 || Socorro || LINEAR || — || align=right | 4.0 km || 
|-id=561 bgcolor=#d6d6d6
| 26561 ||  || — || March 8, 2000 || Socorro || LINEAR || 7:4 || align=right | 14 km || 
|-id=562 bgcolor=#E9E9E9
| 26562 ||  || — || March 8, 2000 || Socorro || LINEAR || ADE || align=right | 8.5 km || 
|-id=563 bgcolor=#d6d6d6
| 26563 ||  || — || March 8, 2000 || Socorro || LINEAR || — || align=right | 14 km || 
|-id=564 bgcolor=#E9E9E9
| 26564 ||  || — || March 9, 2000 || Socorro || LINEAR || MAR || align=right | 4.2 km || 
|-id=565 bgcolor=#d6d6d6
| 26565 ||  || — || March 9, 2000 || Socorro || LINEAR || — || align=right | 14 km || 
|-id=566 bgcolor=#d6d6d6
| 26566 ||  || — || March 9, 2000 || Socorro || LINEAR || — || align=right | 7.9 km || 
|-id=567 bgcolor=#E9E9E9
| 26567 ||  || — || March 9, 2000 || Socorro || LINEAR || — || align=right | 4.3 km || 
|-id=568 bgcolor=#d6d6d6
| 26568 ||  || — || March 9, 2000 || Socorro || LINEAR || MEL || align=right | 17 km || 
|-id=569 bgcolor=#fefefe
| 26569 ||  || — || March 5, 2000 || Socorro || LINEAR || — || align=right | 7.6 km || 
|-id=570 bgcolor=#d6d6d6
| 26570 ||  || — || March 5, 2000 || Socorro || LINEAR || — || align=right | 13 km || 
|-id=571 bgcolor=#E9E9E9
| 26571 ||  || — || March 7, 2000 || Socorro || LINEAR || — || align=right | 10 km || 
|-id=572 bgcolor=#d6d6d6
| 26572 ||  || — || March 8, 2000 || Socorro || LINEAR || EMA || align=right | 12 km || 
|-id=573 bgcolor=#fefefe
| 26573 ||  || — || March 8, 2000 || Socorro || LINEAR || V || align=right | 4.2 km || 
|-id=574 bgcolor=#E9E9E9
| 26574 ||  || — || March 8, 2000 || Socorro || LINEAR || — || align=right | 8.8 km || 
|-id=575 bgcolor=#fefefe
| 26575 Andreapugh ||  ||  || March 9, 2000 || Socorro || LINEAR || NYS || align=right | 2.8 km || 
|-id=576 bgcolor=#d6d6d6
| 26576 ||  || — || March 9, 2000 || Socorro || LINEAR || — || align=right | 6.9 km || 
|-id=577 bgcolor=#d6d6d6
| 26577 ||  || — || March 9, 2000 || Socorro || LINEAR || EOS || align=right | 7.6 km || 
|-id=578 bgcolor=#d6d6d6
| 26578 Cellinekim ||  ||  || March 9, 2000 || Socorro || LINEAR || EOS || align=right | 5.8 km || 
|-id=579 bgcolor=#d6d6d6
| 26579 ||  || — || March 10, 2000 || Socorro || LINEAR || — || align=right | 9.8 km || 
|-id=580 bgcolor=#E9E9E9
| 26580 ||  || — || March 12, 2000 || Socorro || LINEAR || EUN || align=right | 5.5 km || 
|-id=581 bgcolor=#E9E9E9
| 26581 ||  || — || March 8, 2000 || Socorro || LINEAR || — || align=right | 5.9 km || 
|-id=582 bgcolor=#E9E9E9
| 26582 ||  || — || March 8, 2000 || Socorro || LINEAR || — || align=right | 5.6 km || 
|-id=583 bgcolor=#d6d6d6
| 26583 ||  || — || March 8, 2000 || Haleakala || NEAT || — || align=right | 8.5 km || 
|-id=584 bgcolor=#d6d6d6
| 26584 ||  || — || March 9, 2000 || Socorro || LINEAR || — || align=right | 5.7 km || 
|-id=585 bgcolor=#d6d6d6
| 26585 ||  || — || March 10, 2000 || Kitt Peak || Spacewatch || THM || align=right | 8.4 km || 
|-id=586 bgcolor=#E9E9E9
| 26586 Harshaw ||  ||  || March 10, 2000 || Catalina || R. Hill || GEF || align=right | 5.8 km || 
|-id=587 bgcolor=#E9E9E9
| 26587 Arthurstorbo ||  ||  || March 11, 2000 || Anderson Mesa || LONEOS || — || align=right | 6.9 km || 
|-id=588 bgcolor=#E9E9E9
| 26588 Sharonstorbo ||  ||  || March 11, 2000 || Anderson Mesa || LONEOS || — || align=right | 6.9 km || 
|-id=589 bgcolor=#E9E9E9
| 26589 ||  || — || March 11, 2000 || Socorro || LINEAR || — || align=right | 3.4 km || 
|-id=590 bgcolor=#fefefe
| 26590 ||  || — || March 12, 2000 || Socorro || LINEAR || V || align=right | 3.3 km || 
|-id=591 bgcolor=#E9E9E9
| 26591 Robertreeves ||  ||  || March 2, 2000 || Catalina || R. Hill || — || align=right | 4.7 km || 
|-id=592 bgcolor=#E9E9E9
| 26592 Maryrenfro ||  ||  || March 3, 2000 || Catalina || CSS || EUN || align=right | 5.7 km || 
|-id=593 bgcolor=#d6d6d6
| 26593 Perrypat ||  ||  || March 3, 2000 || Catalina || CSS || EOS || align=right | 7.1 km || 
|-id=594 bgcolor=#d6d6d6
| 26594 ||  || — || March 5, 2000 || Haleakala || NEAT || EOS || align=right | 9.4 km || 
|-id=595 bgcolor=#d6d6d6
| 26595 ||  || — || March 6, 2000 || Haleakala || NEAT || EOS || align=right | 5.0 km || 
|-id=596 bgcolor=#E9E9E9
| 26596 ||  || — || March 5, 2000 || Socorro || LINEAR || — || align=right | 5.3 km || 
|-id=597 bgcolor=#d6d6d6
| 26597 ||  || — || March 5, 2000 || Socorro || LINEAR || EOS || align=right | 6.3 km || 
|-id=598 bgcolor=#d6d6d6
| 26598 ||  || — || March 5, 2000 || Socorro || LINEAR || — || align=right | 9.5 km || 
|-id=599 bgcolor=#d6d6d6
| 26599 ||  || — || March 8, 2000 || Socorro || LINEAR || — || align=right | 14 km || 
|-id=600 bgcolor=#fefefe
| 26600 ||  || — || March 5, 2000 || Socorro || LINEAR || — || align=right | 2.2 km || 
|}

26601–26700 

|-bgcolor=#C2FFFF
| 26601 ||  || — || March 26, 2000 || Socorro || LINEAR || L4 || align=right | 25 km || 
|-id=602 bgcolor=#d6d6d6
| 26602 ||  || — || March 28, 2000 || Socorro || LINEAR || — || align=right | 5.1 km || 
|-id=603 bgcolor=#d6d6d6
| 26603 ||  || — || March 29, 2000 || Socorro || LINEAR || EOS || align=right | 9.6 km || 
|-id=604 bgcolor=#d6d6d6
| 26604 Ensign ||  ||  || March 27, 2000 || Anderson Mesa || LONEOS || — || align=right | 7.0 km || 
|-id=605 bgcolor=#fefefe
| 26605 Hanley ||  ||  || March 27, 2000 || Anderson Mesa || LONEOS || — || align=right | 4.0 km || 
|-id=606 bgcolor=#d6d6d6
| 26606 ||  || — || March 28, 2000 || Socorro || LINEAR || EOS || align=right | 6.5 km || 
|-id=607 bgcolor=#d6d6d6
| 26607 ||  || — || March 29, 2000 || Socorro || LINEAR || 7:4 || align=right | 15 km || 
|-id=608 bgcolor=#d6d6d6
| 26608 ||  || — || March 29, 2000 || Socorro || LINEAR || — || align=right | 7.8 km || 
|-id=609 bgcolor=#d6d6d6
| 26609 ||  || — || March 29, 2000 || Socorro || LINEAR || HYG || align=right | 9.7 km || 
|-id=610 bgcolor=#d6d6d6
| 26610 ||  || — || March 29, 2000 || Socorro || LINEAR || — || align=right | 16 km || 
|-id=611 bgcolor=#fefefe
| 26611 Madzlandon ||  ||  || March 29, 2000 || Socorro || LINEAR || V || align=right | 3.7 km || 
|-id=612 bgcolor=#E9E9E9
| 26612 Sunsetastro ||  ||  || March 30, 2000 || Catalina || CSS || — || align=right | 3.7 km || 
|-id=613 bgcolor=#d6d6d6
| 26613 ||  || — || April 3, 2000 || Reedy Creek || J. Broughton || — || align=right | 6.9 km || 
|-id=614 bgcolor=#d6d6d6
| 26614 ||  || — || April 5, 2000 || Fountain Hills || C. W. Juels || THM || align=right | 9.9 km || 
|-id=615 bgcolor=#d6d6d6
| 26615 ||  || — || April 4, 2000 || Socorro || LINEAR || — || align=right | 6.9 km || 
|-id=616 bgcolor=#E9E9E9
| 26616 ||  || — || April 4, 2000 || Socorro || LINEAR || ADE || align=right | 11 km || 
|-id=617 bgcolor=#fefefe
| 26617 ||  || — || April 5, 2000 || Socorro || LINEAR || FLO || align=right | 2.9 km || 
|-id=618 bgcolor=#d6d6d6
| 26618 Yixinli ||  ||  || April 5, 2000 || Socorro || LINEAR || — || align=right | 7.3 km || 
|-id=619 bgcolor=#d6d6d6
| 26619 ||  || — || April 5, 2000 || Socorro || LINEAR || KOR || align=right | 5.5 km || 
|-id=620 bgcolor=#d6d6d6
| 26620 Yihuali ||  ||  || April 5, 2000 || Socorro || LINEAR || — || align=right | 6.5 km || 
|-id=621 bgcolor=#d6d6d6
| 26621 ||  || — || April 5, 2000 || Socorro || LINEAR || — || align=right | 9.9 km || 
|-id=622 bgcolor=#E9E9E9
| 26622 Maxwimberley ||  ||  || April 5, 2000 || Socorro || LINEAR || — || align=right | 2.7 km || 
|-id=623 bgcolor=#d6d6d6
| 26623 ||  || — || April 8, 2000 || Farpoint || Farpoint Obs. || — || align=right | 13 km || 
|-id=624 bgcolor=#fefefe
| 26624 ||  || — || April 4, 2000 || Socorro || LINEAR || V || align=right | 3.8 km || 
|-id=625 bgcolor=#d6d6d6
| 26625 ||  || — || April 5, 2000 || Socorro || LINEAR || HYG || align=right | 11 km || 
|-id=626 bgcolor=#E9E9E9
| 26626 ||  || — || April 6, 2000 || Socorro || LINEAR || EUN || align=right | 4.3 km || 
|-id=627 bgcolor=#E9E9E9
| 26627 ||  || — || April 7, 2000 || Socorro || LINEAR || — || align=right | 6.8 km || 
|-id=628 bgcolor=#d6d6d6
| 26628 ||  || — || April 7, 2000 || Socorro || LINEAR || — || align=right | 12 km || 
|-id=629 bgcolor=#E9E9E9
| 26629 Zahller ||  ||  || April 12, 2000 || USNO Flagstaff || C. B. Luginbuhl || EUN || align=right | 5.0 km || 
|-id=630 bgcolor=#E9E9E9
| 26630 ||  || — || April 12, 2000 || Haleakala || NEAT || — || align=right | 5.5 km || 
|-id=631 bgcolor=#d6d6d6
| 26631 ||  || — || April 12, 2000 || Socorro || LINEAR || EOS || align=right | 7.4 km || 
|-id=632 bgcolor=#E9E9E9
| 26632 ||  || — || April 28, 2000 || Socorro || LINEAR || — || align=right | 7.1 km || 
|-id=633 bgcolor=#d6d6d6
| 26633 ||  || — || April 29, 2000 || Socorro || LINEAR || THM || align=right | 8.1 km || 
|-id=634 bgcolor=#d6d6d6
| 26634 Balasubramanian ||  ||  || April 29, 2000 || Socorro || LINEAR || THM || align=right | 7.1 km || 
|-id=635 bgcolor=#d6d6d6
| 26635 ||  || — || April 29, 2000 || Socorro || LINEAR || THM || align=right | 11 km || 
|-id=636 bgcolor=#E9E9E9
| 26636 Ericabroman ||  ||  || April 24, 2000 || Anderson Mesa || LONEOS || EUN || align=right | 7.0 km || 
|-id=637 bgcolor=#E9E9E9
| 26637 ||  || — || April 29, 2000 || Socorro || LINEAR || — || align=right | 3.6 km || 
|-id=638 bgcolor=#E9E9E9
| 26638 ||  || — || April 28, 2000 || Socorro || LINEAR || HNS || align=right | 4.0 km || 
|-id=639 bgcolor=#fefefe
| 26639 Murgaš ||  ||  || May 5, 2000 || Ondřejov || P. Kušnirák || — || align=right | 4.7 km || 
|-id=640 bgcolor=#d6d6d6
| 26640 Bahýľ ||  ||  || May 9, 2000 || Ondřejov || P. Kušnirák || — || align=right | 4.5 km || 
|-id=641 bgcolor=#d6d6d6
| 26641 ||  || — || May 7, 2000 || Socorro || LINEAR || VER || align=right | 14 km || 
|-id=642 bgcolor=#d6d6d6
| 26642 Schlenoff ||  ||  || May 6, 2000 || Socorro || LINEAR || KOR || align=right | 4.0 km || 
|-id=643 bgcolor=#E9E9E9
| 26643 ||  || — || May 7, 2000 || Socorro || LINEAR || — || align=right | 6.1 km || 
|-id=644 bgcolor=#E9E9E9
| 26644 ||  || — || May 7, 2000 || Socorro || LINEAR || EUN || align=right | 4.3 km || 
|-id=645 bgcolor=#d6d6d6
| 26645 ||  || — || May 6, 2000 || Socorro || LINEAR || 7:4 || align=right | 11 km || 
|-id=646 bgcolor=#d6d6d6
| 26646 ||  || — || May 31, 2000 || Socorro || LINEAR || — || align=right | 8.6 km || 
|-id=647 bgcolor=#d6d6d6
| 26647 || 2000 LT || — || June 2, 2000 || Reedy Creek || J. Broughton || URS || align=right | 17 km || 
|-id=648 bgcolor=#d6d6d6
| 26648 ||  || — || June 5, 2000 || Socorro || LINEAR || INA || align=right | 10 km || 
|-id=649 bgcolor=#d6d6d6
| 26649 ||  || — || June 30, 2000 || Haleakala || NEAT || ALA || align=right | 16 km || 
|-id=650 bgcolor=#E9E9E9
| 26650 ||  || — || July 31, 2000 || Socorro || LINEAR || — || align=right | 3.1 km || 
|-id=651 bgcolor=#fefefe
| 26651 ||  || — || July 30, 2000 || Socorro || LINEAR || — || align=right | 4.5 km || 
|-id=652 bgcolor=#E9E9E9
| 26652 Klinglesmith ||  ||  || August 20, 2000 || Anderson Mesa || LONEOS || — || align=right | 5.0 km || 
|-id=653 bgcolor=#fefefe
| 26653 Amymeyer ||  ||  || September 4, 2000 || Socorro || LINEAR || — || align=right | 2.7 km || 
|-id=654 bgcolor=#E9E9E9
| 26654 Ericjohnson ||  ||  || September 5, 2000 || Anderson Mesa || LONEOS || — || align=right | 4.6 km || 
|-id=655 bgcolor=#E9E9E9
| 26655 ||  || — || September 24, 2000 || Socorro || LINEAR || — || align=right | 5.1 km || 
|-id=656 bgcolor=#fefefe
| 26656 Samarenae ||  ||  || September 27, 2000 || Socorro || LINEAR || — || align=right | 3.2 km || 
|-id=657 bgcolor=#E9E9E9
| 26657 ||  || — || September 27, 2000 || Socorro || LINEAR || — || align=right | 7.0 km || 
|-id=658 bgcolor=#fefefe
| 26658 ||  || — || October 24, 2000 || Socorro || LINEAR || — || align=right | 4.6 km || 
|-id=659 bgcolor=#fefefe
| 26659 Skirda ||  ||  || November 1, 2000 || Socorro || LINEAR || FLO || align=right | 2.1 km || 
|-id=660 bgcolor=#fefefe
| 26660 Samahalpern ||  ||  || November 1, 2000 || Socorro || LINEAR || — || align=right | 4.5 km || 
|-id=661 bgcolor=#fefefe
| 26661 Kempelen ||  ||  || November 27, 2000 || Ondřejov || P. Kušnirák || V || align=right | 1.6 km || 
|-id=662 bgcolor=#E9E9E9
| 26662 ||  || — || November 29, 2000 || Socorro || LINEAR || MIT || align=right | 6.2 km || 
|-id=663 bgcolor=#FFC2E0
| 26663 ||  || — || December 15, 2000 || Socorro || LINEAR || APO +1kmPHA || align=right data-sort-value="0.83" | 830 m || 
|-id=664 bgcolor=#E9E9E9
| 26664 Jongwon ||  ||  || December 20, 2000 || Socorro || LINEAR || — || align=right | 2.4 km || 
|-id=665 bgcolor=#fefefe
| 26665 Sidjena ||  ||  || December 30, 2000 || Socorro || LINEAR || — || align=right | 2.3 km || 
|-id=666 bgcolor=#fefefe
| 26666 Justinto ||  ||  || December 30, 2000 || Socorro || LINEAR || — || align=right | 3.1 km || 
|-id=667 bgcolor=#fefefe
| 26667 Sherwinwu ||  ||  || January 3, 2001 || Socorro || LINEAR || — || align=right | 4.2 km || 
|-id=668 bgcolor=#d6d6d6
| 26668 Tonyho ||  ||  || January 19, 2001 || Socorro || LINEAR || — || align=right | 7.8 km || 
|-id=669 bgcolor=#d6d6d6
| 26669 ||  || — || January 19, 2001 || Socorro || LINEAR || — || align=right | 5.8 km || 
|-id=670 bgcolor=#E9E9E9
| 26670 ||  || — || January 30, 2001 || Socorro || LINEAR || — || align=right | 3.8 km || 
|-id=671 bgcolor=#fefefe
| 26671 Williamlopes ||  ||  || February 19, 2001 || Socorro || LINEAR || — || align=right | 3.7 km || 
|-id=672 bgcolor=#fefefe
| 26672 Ericabrooke ||  ||  || February 19, 2001 || Socorro || LINEAR || — || align=right | 2.7 km || 
|-id=673 bgcolor=#fefefe
| 26673 ||  || — || February 20, 2001 || Haleakala || NEAT || — || align=right | 6.0 km || 
|-id=674 bgcolor=#d6d6d6
| 26674 ||  || — || February 17, 2001 || Socorro || LINEAR || — || align=right | 9.1 km || 
|-id=675 bgcolor=#E9E9E9
| 26675 || 2001 EZ || — || March 1, 2001 || Socorro || LINEAR || — || align=right | 8.7 km || 
|-id=676 bgcolor=#E9E9E9
| 26676 ||  || — || March 2, 2001 || Haleakala || NEAT || — || align=right | 3.6 km || 
|-id=677 bgcolor=#FA8072
| 26677 ||  || — || March 15, 2001 || Socorro || LINEAR || — || align=right | 1.3 km || 
|-id=678 bgcolor=#d6d6d6
| 26678 Garner ||  ||  || March 15, 2001 || Anderson Mesa || LONEOS || — || align=right | 13 km || 
|-id=679 bgcolor=#E9E9E9
| 26679 Thomassilver ||  ||  || March 18, 2001 || Socorro || LINEAR || RAF || align=right | 3.3 km || 
|-id=680 bgcolor=#E9E9E9
| 26680 Wangchristi ||  ||  || March 18, 2001 || Socorro || LINEAR || RAF || align=right | 3.7 km || 
|-id=681 bgcolor=#fefefe
| 26681 Niezgay ||  ||  || March 18, 2001 || Socorro || LINEAR || NYS || align=right | 2.0 km || 
|-id=682 bgcolor=#fefefe
| 26682 Evanfletcher ||  ||  || March 19, 2001 || Socorro || LINEAR || NYS || align=right | 1.9 km || 
|-id=683 bgcolor=#E9E9E9
| 26683 Jamesmccarthy ||  ||  || March 21, 2001 || Anderson Mesa || LONEOS || EUN || align=right | 3.3 km || 
|-id=684 bgcolor=#fefefe
| 26684 ||  || — || March 18, 2001 || Socorro || LINEAR || — || align=right | 1.4 km || 
|-id=685 bgcolor=#d6d6d6
| 26685 Khojandi ||  ||  || March 18, 2001 || Socorro || LINEAR || THM || align=right | 7.0 km || 
|-id=686 bgcolor=#fefefe
| 26686 Ellenprice ||  ||  || March 18, 2001 || Socorro || LINEAR || NYS || align=right | 1.5 km || 
|-id=687 bgcolor=#E9E9E9
| 26687 ||  || — || March 18, 2001 || Socorro || LINEAR || EUN || align=right | 5.2 km || 
|-id=688 bgcolor=#d6d6d6
| 26688 Wangenevieve ||  ||  || March 19, 2001 || Socorro || LINEAR || KOR || align=right | 4.1 km || 
|-id=689 bgcolor=#E9E9E9
| 26689 Smorrison ||  ||  || March 23, 2001 || Socorro || LINEAR || — || align=right | 2.2 km || 
|-id=690 bgcolor=#fefefe
| 26690 ||  || — || March 19, 2001 || Socorro || LINEAR || — || align=right | 2.8 km || 
|-id=691 bgcolor=#fefefe
| 26691 Lareegardner ||  ||  || March 19, 2001 || Socorro || LINEAR || — || align=right | 2.1 km || 
|-id=692 bgcolor=#d6d6d6
| 26692 ||  || — || March 21, 2001 || Socorro || LINEAR || — || align=right | 6.2 km || 
|-id=693 bgcolor=#fefefe
| 26693 Katharinecorbin ||  ||  || March 21, 2001 || Anderson Mesa || LONEOS || — || align=right | 1.5 km || 
|-id=694 bgcolor=#fefefe
| 26694 Wenxili ||  ||  || March 16, 2001 || Socorro || LINEAR || V || align=right | 2.1 km || 
|-id=695 bgcolor=#d6d6d6
| 26695 ||  || — || March 18, 2001 || Socorro || LINEAR || LIX || align=right | 6.6 km || 
|-id=696 bgcolor=#fefefe
| 26696 Gechenzhang ||  ||  || March 18, 2001 || Socorro || LINEAR || — || align=right | 2.2 km || 
|-id=697 bgcolor=#E9E9E9
| 26697 ||  || — || March 29, 2001 || Socorro || LINEAR || GEF || align=right | 4.3 km || 
|-id=698 bgcolor=#fefefe
| 26698 Maryschroeder ||  ||  || March 31, 2001 || Anderson Mesa || LONEOS || — || align=right | 2.9 km || 
|-id=699 bgcolor=#fefefe
| 26699 Masoncole ||  ||  || March 30, 2001 || Socorro || LINEAR || — || align=right | 2.4 km || 
|-id=700 bgcolor=#d6d6d6
| 26700 ||  || — || March 20, 2001 || Haleakala || NEAT || EOS || align=right | 6.7 km || 
|}

26701–26800 

|-bgcolor=#d6d6d6
| 26701 ||  || — || March 20, 2001 || Haleakala || NEAT || EOS || align=right | 4.8 km || 
|-id=702 bgcolor=#d6d6d6
| 26702 Naber ||  ||  || March 23, 2001 || Anderson Mesa || LONEOS || — || align=right | 12 km || 
|-id=703 bgcolor=#E9E9E9
| 26703 Price ||  ||  || March 23, 2001 || Anderson Mesa || LONEOS || — || align=right | 2.8 km || 
|-id=704 bgcolor=#E9E9E9
| 26704 ||  || — || March 23, 2001 || Kitt Peak || Spacewatch || HEN || align=right | 2.4 km || 
|-id=705 bgcolor=#C2FFFF
| 26705 ||  || — || March 24, 2001 || Anderson Mesa || LONEOS || L4 || align=right | 21 km || 
|-id=706 bgcolor=#E9E9E9
| 26706 ||  || — || March 26, 2001 || Kitt Peak || Spacewatch || — || align=right | 4.7 km || 
|-id=707 bgcolor=#fefefe
| 26707 Navrazhnykh ||  ||  || March 26, 2001 || Socorro || LINEAR || — || align=right | 2.4 km || 
|-id=708 bgcolor=#fefefe
| 26708 ||  || — || March 27, 2001 || Haleakala || NEAT || FLO || align=right | 1.4 km || 
|-id=709 bgcolor=#E9E9E9
| 26709 ||  || — || March 28, 2001 || Socorro || LINEAR || ADE || align=right | 8.0 km || 
|-id=710 bgcolor=#E9E9E9
| 26710 ||  || — || March 28, 2001 || Socorro || LINEAR || EUN || align=right | 3.3 km || 
|-id=711 bgcolor=#d6d6d6
| 26711 Rebekahbau ||  ||  || March 24, 2001 || Socorro || LINEAR || — || align=right | 5.7 km || 
|-id=712 bgcolor=#fefefe
| 26712 Stewart ||  ||  || March 20, 2001 || Anderson Mesa || LONEOS || MAS || align=right | 1.7 km || 
|-id=713 bgcolor=#d6d6d6
| 26713 Iusukyin || 2001 GR ||  || April 13, 2001 || Desert Beaver || W. K. Y. Yeung || EOS || align=right | 5.6 km || 
|-id=714 bgcolor=#fefefe
| 26714 ||  || — || April 13, 2001 || Socorro || LINEAR || H || align=right | 1.6 km || 
|-id=715 bgcolor=#E9E9E9
| 26715 South Dakota || 2001 HJ ||  || April 16, 2001 || Badlands || R. Dyvig || — || align=right | 5.2 km || 
|-id=716 bgcolor=#fefefe
| 26716 ||  || — || April 18, 2001 || Reedy Creek || J. Broughton || FLO || align=right | 2.1 km || 
|-id=717 bgcolor=#fefefe
| 26717 Jasonye ||  ||  || April 18, 2001 || Socorro || LINEAR || FLO || align=right | 1.8 km || 
|-id=718 bgcolor=#d6d6d6
| 26718 ||  || — || April 18, 2001 || Socorro || LINEAR || ALA || align=right | 23 km || 
|-id=719 bgcolor=#d6d6d6
| 26719 ||  || — || April 18, 2001 || Socorro || LINEAR || HYG || align=right | 12 km || 
|-id=720 bgcolor=#fefefe
| 26720 Yangxinyan ||  ||  || April 18, 2001 || Socorro || LINEAR || — || align=right | 2.3 km || 
|-id=721 bgcolor=#fefefe
| 26721 ||  || — || April 18, 2001 || Socorro || LINEAR || — || align=right | 3.4 km || 
|-id=722 bgcolor=#d6d6d6
| 26722 ||  || — || April 21, 2001 || Socorro || LINEAR || — || align=right | 16 km || 
|-id=723 bgcolor=#fefefe
| 26723 ||  || — || April 18, 2001 || Kitt Peak || Spacewatch || — || align=right | 2.0 km || 
|-id=724 bgcolor=#d6d6d6
| 26724 ||  || — || April 16, 2001 || Socorro || LINEAR || TIR || align=right | 8.8 km || 
|-id=725 bgcolor=#d6d6d6
| 26725 ||  || — || April 16, 2001 || Socorro || LINEAR || — || align=right | 13 km || 
|-id=726 bgcolor=#fefefe
| 26726 ||  || — || April 16, 2001 || Socorro || LINEAR || — || align=right | 2.5 km || 
|-id=727 bgcolor=#E9E9E9
| 26727 Wujunjun ||  ||  || April 16, 2001 || Socorro || LINEAR || KON || align=right | 7.1 km || 
|-id=728 bgcolor=#E9E9E9
| 26728 Luwenqi ||  ||  || April 16, 2001 || Socorro || LINEAR || HEN || align=right | 3.1 km || 
|-id=729 bgcolor=#E9E9E9
| 26729 ||  || — || April 18, 2001 || Socorro || LINEAR || GEF || align=right | 6.5 km || 
|-id=730 bgcolor=#d6d6d6
| 26730 ||  || — || April 18, 2001 || Socorro || LINEAR || — || align=right | 5.4 km || 
|-id=731 bgcolor=#E9E9E9
| 26731 ||  || — || April 23, 2001 || Reedy Creek || J. Broughton || — || align=right | 7.5 km || 
|-id=732 bgcolor=#fefefe
| 26732 Damianpeach ||  ||  || April 22, 2001 || Desert Beaver || W. K. Y. Yeung || — || align=right | 2.6 km || 
|-id=733 bgcolor=#E9E9E9
| 26733 Nanavisitor ||  ||  || April 22, 2001 || Desert Beaver || W. K. Y. Yeung || — || align=right | 2.7 km || 
|-id=734 bgcolor=#E9E9E9
| 26734 Terryfarrell ||  ||  || April 23, 2001 || Desert Beaver || W. K. Y. Yeung || — || align=right | 3.1 km || 
|-id=735 bgcolor=#d6d6d6
| 26735 ||  || — || April 27, 2001 || Socorro || LINEAR || EOS || align=right | 6.6 km || 
|-id=736 bgcolor=#fefefe
| 26736 Rojeski ||  ||  || April 27, 2001 || Socorro || LINEAR || V || align=right | 1.8 km || 
|-id=737 bgcolor=#fefefe
| 26737 Adambradley ||  ||  || April 27, 2001 || Socorro || LINEAR || FLO || align=right | 3.6 km || 
|-id=738 bgcolor=#fefefe
| 26738 Lishizhen ||  ||  || April 28, 2001 || Desert Beaver || W. K. Y. Yeung || — || align=right | 2.4 km || 
|-id=739 bgcolor=#fefefe
| 26739 Hemaeberhart ||  ||  || April 23, 2001 || Socorro || LINEAR || — || align=right | 2.0 km || 
|-id=740 bgcolor=#d6d6d6
| 26740 Camacho ||  ||  || April 27, 2001 || Socorro || LINEAR || THM || align=right | 6.6 km || 
|-id=741 bgcolor=#fefefe
| 26741 ||  || — || April 29, 2001 || Socorro || LINEAR || V || align=right | 2.4 km || 
|-id=742 bgcolor=#E9E9E9
| 26742 ||  || — || April 29, 2001 || Socorro || LINEAR || — || align=right | 2.6 km || 
|-id=743 bgcolor=#d6d6d6
| 26743 Laichinglung ||  ||  || April 30, 2001 || Desert Beaver || W. K. Y. Yeung || EOS || align=right | 6.9 km || 
|-id=744 bgcolor=#fefefe
| 26744 Marthahaynes ||  ||  || April 16, 2001 || Anderson Mesa || NEAT || FLO || align=right | 2.0 km || 
|-id=745 bgcolor=#E9E9E9
| 26745 Szeglin ||  ||  || April 17, 2001 || Anderson Mesa || LONEOS || GEF || align=right | 4.4 km || 
|-id=746 bgcolor=#d6d6d6
| 26746 ||  || — || April 18, 2001 || Socorro || LINEAR || — || align=right | 8.5 km || 
|-id=747 bgcolor=#E9E9E9
| 26747 ||  || — || April 18, 2001 || Socorro || LINEAR || — || align=right | 3.8 km || 
|-id=748 bgcolor=#fefefe
| 26748 Targovnik ||  ||  || April 23, 2001 || Anderson Mesa || LONEOS || — || align=right | 2.6 km || 
|-id=749 bgcolor=#fefefe
| 26749 ||  || — || April 23, 2001 || Socorro || LINEAR || — || align=right | 2.2 km || 
|-id=750 bgcolor=#E9E9E9
| 26750 ||  || — || April 24, 2001 || Socorro || LINEAR || — || align=right | 5.0 km || 
|-id=751 bgcolor=#fefefe
| 26751 ||  || — || April 27, 2001 || Haleakala || NEAT || — || align=right | 2.0 km || 
|-id=752 bgcolor=#d6d6d6
| 26752 ||  || — || April 30, 2001 || Socorro || LINEAR || — || align=right | 5.1 km || 
|-id=753 bgcolor=#fefefe
| 26753 ||  || — || April 24, 2001 || Socorro || LINEAR || — || align=right | 2.9 km || 
|-id=754 bgcolor=#fefefe
| 26754 ||  || — || May 15, 2001 || Palomar || NEAT || — || align=right | 3.4 km || 
|-id=755 bgcolor=#d6d6d6
| 26755 ||  || — || May 17, 2001 || Socorro || LINEAR || 7:4 || align=right | 10 km || 
|-id=756 bgcolor=#fefefe
| 26756 ||  || — || May 18, 2001 || Socorro || LINEAR || NYS || align=right | 3.5 km || 
|-id=757 bgcolor=#E9E9E9
| 26757 Bastei ||  ||  || May 20, 2001 || Drebach || Drebach Obs. || — || align=right | 6.1 km || 
|-id=758 bgcolor=#d6d6d6
| 26758 ||  || — || May 22, 2001 || Socorro || LINEAR || — || align=right | 9.5 km || 
|-id=759 bgcolor=#E9E9E9
| 26759 ||  || — || May 17, 2001 || Socorro || LINEAR || — || align=right | 3.7 km || 
|-id=760 bgcolor=#FFC2E0
| 26760 ||  || — || May 23, 2001 || Socorro || LINEAR || AMO +1km || align=right | 5.4 km || 
|-id=761 bgcolor=#d6d6d6
| 26761 Stromboli || 2033 P-L ||  || September 24, 1960 || Palomar || PLS || 3:2 || align=right | 17 km || 
|-id=762 bgcolor=#E9E9E9
| 26762 || 2564 P-L || — || September 24, 1960 || Palomar || PLS || — || align=right | 4.4 km || 
|-id=763 bgcolor=#C2FFFF
| 26763 Peirithoos || 2706 P-L ||  || September 24, 1960 || Palomar || PLS || L4 || align=right | 12 km || 
|-id=764 bgcolor=#E9E9E9
| 26764 || 2800 P-L || — || September 24, 1960 || Palomar || PLS || — || align=right | 2.8 km || 
|-id=765 bgcolor=#fefefe
| 26765 || 3038 P-L || — || September 24, 1960 || Palomar || PLS || — || align=right | 2.6 km || 
|-id=766 bgcolor=#d6d6d6
| 26766 || 3052 P-L || — || September 24, 1960 || Palomar || PLS || EOS || align=right | 6.0 km || 
|-id=767 bgcolor=#E9E9E9
| 26767 || 4084 P-L || — || September 24, 1960 || Palomar || PLS || — || align=right | 3.3 km || 
|-id=768 bgcolor=#d6d6d6
| 26768 || 4608 P-L || — || September 24, 1960 || Palomar || PLS || EOS || align=right | 5.5 km || 
|-id=769 bgcolor=#E9E9E9
| 26769 || 4658 P-L || — || September 24, 1960 || Palomar || PLS || — || align=right | 7.4 km || 
|-id=770 bgcolor=#fefefe
| 26770 || 4734 P-L || — || September 24, 1960 || Palomar || PLS || — || align=right | 1.9 km || 
|-id=771 bgcolor=#d6d6d6
| 26771 || 4846 P-L || — || September 24, 1960 || Palomar || PLS || — || align=right | 7.8 km || 
|-id=772 bgcolor=#fefefe
| 26772 || 6033 P-L || — || September 24, 1960 || Palomar || PLS || — || align=right | 2.4 km || 
|-id=773 bgcolor=#E9E9E9
| 26773 || 3254 T-1 || — || March 26, 1971 || Palomar || PLS || — || align=right | 4.0 km || 
|-id=774 bgcolor=#fefefe
| 26774 || 4189 T-1 || — || March 26, 1971 || Palomar || PLS || — || align=right | 1.6 km || 
|-id=775 bgcolor=#E9E9E9
| 26775 || 4205 T-1 || — || March 26, 1971 || Palomar || PLS || EUN || align=right | 5.3 km || 
|-id=776 bgcolor=#d6d6d6
| 26776 || 4236 T-1 || — || March 26, 1971 || Palomar || PLS || — || align=right | 9.5 km || 
|-id=777 bgcolor=#E9E9E9
| 26777 || 1225 T-2 || — || September 29, 1973 || Palomar || PLS || — || align=right | 2.6 km || 
|-id=778 bgcolor=#d6d6d6
| 26778 || 1354 T-2 || — || September 29, 1973 || Palomar || PLS || — || align=right | 5.8 km || 
|-id=779 bgcolor=#fefefe
| 26779 || 2191 T-2 || — || September 29, 1973 || Palomar || PLS || — || align=right | 1.7 km || 
|-id=780 bgcolor=#E9E9E9
| 26780 || 2313 T-2 || — || September 29, 1973 || Palomar || PLS || — || align=right | 3.5 km || 
|-id=781 bgcolor=#fefefe
| 26781 || 3182 T-2 || — || September 30, 1973 || Palomar || PLS || — || align=right | 3.1 km || 
|-id=782 bgcolor=#d6d6d6
| 26782 || 4174 T-2 || — || September 29, 1973 || Palomar || PLS || KOR || align=right | 3.3 km || 
|-id=783 bgcolor=#fefefe
| 26783 || 1085 T-3 || — || October 17, 1977 || Palomar || PLS || V || align=right | 3.0 km || 
|-id=784 bgcolor=#d6d6d6
| 26784 || 2103 T-3 || — || October 16, 1977 || Palomar || PLS || EOS || align=right | 6.4 km || 
|-id=785 bgcolor=#d6d6d6
| 26785 || 2496 T-3 || — || October 16, 1977 || Palomar || PLS || EOS || align=right | 5.9 km || 
|-id=786 bgcolor=#fefefe
| 26786 || 3382 T-3 || — || October 16, 1977 || Palomar || PLS || V || align=right | 2.6 km || 
|-id=787 bgcolor=#E9E9E9
| 26787 || 4265 T-3 || — || October 16, 1977 || Palomar || PLS || — || align=right | 7.3 km || 
|-id=788 bgcolor=#fefefe
| 26788 || 4321 T-3 || — || October 16, 1977 || Palomar || PLS || V || align=right | 1.6 km || 
|-id=789 bgcolor=#d6d6d6
| 26789 || 5092 T-3 || — || October 16, 1977 || Palomar || PLS || — || align=right | 11 km || 
|-id=790 bgcolor=#E9E9E9
| 26790 || 5235 T-3 || — || October 17, 1977 || Palomar || PLS || — || align=right | 2.8 km || 
|-id=791 bgcolor=#E9E9E9
| 26791 || 5282 T-3 || — || October 17, 1977 || Palomar || PLS || EUN || align=right | 4.5 km || 
|-id=792 bgcolor=#E9E9E9
| 26792 || 1975 LY || — || June 8, 1975 || El Leoncito || M. R. Cesco || — || align=right | 6.7 km || 
|-id=793 bgcolor=#E9E9E9
| 26793 Bolshoi ||  ||  || January 13, 1977 || Nauchnij || N. S. Chernykh || EUN || align=right | 7.7 km || 
|-id=794 bgcolor=#fefefe
| 26794 Yukioniimi ||  ||  || February 18, 1977 || Kiso || H. Kosai, K. Furukawa || — || align=right | 3.8 km || 
|-id=795 bgcolor=#fefefe
| 26795 Basilashvili ||  ||  || September 26, 1978 || Nauchnij || L. V. Zhuravleva || — || align=right | 2.7 km || 
|-id=796 bgcolor=#fefefe
| 26796 ||  || — || November 7, 1978 || Palomar || E. F. Helin, S. J. Bus || — || align=right | 2.8 km || 
|-id=797 bgcolor=#E9E9E9
| 26797 ||  || — || November 7, 1978 || Palomar || E. F. Helin, S. J. Bus || — || align=right | 3.2 km || 
|-id=798 bgcolor=#fefefe
| 26798 ||  || — || August 22, 1979 || La Silla || C.-I. Lagerkvist || NYS || align=right | 1.5 km || 
|-id=799 bgcolor=#E9E9E9
| 26799 || 1979 XL || — || December 15, 1979 || La Silla || H. Debehogne, E. R. Netto || GEF || align=right | 4.8 km || 
|-id=800 bgcolor=#fefefe
| 26800 Gualtierotrucco ||  ||  || March 6, 1981 || La Silla || H. Debehogne, G. DeSanctis || — || align=right | 5.3 km || 
|}

26801–26900 

|-bgcolor=#fefefe
| 26801 ||  || — || March 1, 1981 || Siding Spring || S. J. Bus || — || align=right | 2.4 km || 
|-id=802 bgcolor=#fefefe
| 26802 ||  || — || March 7, 1981 || Siding Spring || S. J. Bus || V || align=right | 1.9 km || 
|-id=803 bgcolor=#fefefe
| 26803 ||  || — || March 2, 1981 || Siding Spring || S. J. Bus || — || align=right | 2.5 km || 
|-id=804 bgcolor=#fefefe
| 26804 ||  || — || March 2, 1981 || Siding Spring || S. J. Bus || — || align=right | 1.7 km || 
|-id=805 bgcolor=#E9E9E9
| 26805 ||  || — || March 2, 1981 || Siding Spring || S. J. Bus || AGN || align=right | 3.6 km || 
|-id=806 bgcolor=#d6d6d6
| 26806 Kushiike ||  ||  || May 22, 1982 || Kiso || H. Kosai, K. Furukawa || MEL || align=right | 12 km || 
|-id=807 bgcolor=#fefefe
| 26807 ||  || — || September 14, 1982 || Kleť || A. Mrkos || SUL || align=right | 11 km || 
|-id=808 bgcolor=#E9E9E9
| 26808 ||  || — || November 14, 1982 || Kiso || H. Kosai, K. Furukawa || — || align=right | 4.1 km || 
|-id=809 bgcolor=#fefefe
| 26809 || 1984 QU || — || August 24, 1984 || Harvard Observatory || Oak Ridge Observatory || — || align=right | 2.1 km || 
|-id=810 bgcolor=#fefefe
| 26810 ||  || — || February 14, 1985 || La Silla || H. Debehogne || MAS || align=right | 3.2 km || 
|-id=811 bgcolor=#fefefe
| 26811 Hiesinger || 1985 QP ||  || August 22, 1985 || Anderson Mesa || E. Bowell || — || align=right | 2.5 km || 
|-id=812 bgcolor=#fefefe
| 26812 ||  || — || September 4, 1985 || La Silla || H. Debehogne || — || align=right | 2.6 km || 
|-id=813 bgcolor=#fefefe
| 26813 ||  || — || September 7, 1985 || La Silla || H. Debehogne || — || align=right | 2.6 km || 
|-id=814 bgcolor=#fefefe
| 26814 || 1986 GZ || — || April 9, 1986 || Kitt Peak || Spacewatch || PHO || align=right | 2.3 km || 
|-id=815 bgcolor=#fefefe
| 26815 ||  || — || August 27, 1986 || La Silla || H. Debehogne || — || align=right | 4.0 km || 
|-id=816 bgcolor=#d6d6d6
| 26816 || 1986 TS || — || October 4, 1986 || Brorfelde || P. Jensen || — || align=right | 13 km || 
|-id=817 bgcolor=#FFC2E0
| 26817 || 1987 QB || — || August 25, 1987 || Palomar || S. Singer-Brewster || AMO || align=right | 1.2 km || 
|-id=818 bgcolor=#E9E9E9
| 26818 || 1987 QM || — || August 25, 1987 || Palomar || S. Singer-Brewster || — || align=right | 7.7 km || 
|-id=819 bgcolor=#E9E9E9
| 26819 ||  || — || August 23, 1987 || Palomar || E. F. Helin || — || align=right | 2.9 km || 
|-id=820 bgcolor=#fefefe
| 26820 ||  || — || September 20, 1987 || Smolyan || E. W. Elst || — || align=right | 2.6 km || 
|-id=821 bgcolor=#d6d6d6
| 26821 Baehr ||  ||  || March 17, 1988 || Tautenburg Observatory || F. Börngen || EOS || align=right | 16 km || 
|-id=822 bgcolor=#FA8072
| 26822 ||  || — || September 14, 1988 || Cerro Tololo || S. J. Bus || — || align=right | 2.6 km || 
|-id=823 bgcolor=#fefefe
| 26823 ||  || — || September 16, 1988 || Cerro Tololo || S. J. Bus || — || align=right | 2.2 km || 
|-id=824 bgcolor=#E9E9E9
| 26824 ||  || — || October 13, 1988 || Kushiro || S. Ueda, H. Kaneda || — || align=right | 5.0 km || 
|-id=825 bgcolor=#E9E9E9
| 26825 ||  || — || September 26, 1989 || Calar Alto || J. M. Baur, K. Birkle || EUN || align=right | 3.4 km || 
|-id=826 bgcolor=#E9E9E9
| 26826 ||  || — || October 7, 1989 || La Silla || E. W. Elst || — || align=right | 4.3 km || 
|-id=827 bgcolor=#E9E9E9
| 26827 ||  || — || October 30, 1989 || Cerro Tololo || S. J. Bus || — || align=right | 3.5 km || 
|-id=828 bgcolor=#fefefe
| 26828 ||  || — || November 29, 1989 || Kitami || K. Endate, K. Watanabe || NYS || align=right | 3.3 km || 
|-id=829 bgcolor=#E9E9E9
| 26829 Sakaihoikuen ||  ||  || November 30, 1989 || Yatsugatake || Y. Kushida, M. Inoue || — || align=right | 5.1 km || 
|-id=830 bgcolor=#E9E9E9
| 26830 || 1990 BB || — || January 17, 1990 || Toyota || K. Suzuki, T. Urata || — || align=right | 9.1 km || 
|-id=831 bgcolor=#d6d6d6
| 26831 ||  || — || July 27, 1990 || Palomar || H. E. Holt || MEL || align=right | 7.1 km || 
|-id=832 bgcolor=#fefefe
| 26832 ||  || — || August 20, 1990 || La Silla || E. W. Elst || NYS || align=right | 2.5 km || 
|-id=833 bgcolor=#d6d6d6
| 26833 || 1990 RE || — || September 14, 1990 || Palomar || H. E. Holt || — || align=right | 11 km || 
|-id=834 bgcolor=#fefefe
| 26834 ||  || — || September 14, 1990 || Palomar || H. E. Holt || — || align=right | 6.0 km || 
|-id=835 bgcolor=#fefefe
| 26835 ||  || — || September 23, 1990 || La Silla || H. Debehogne || — || align=right | 2.4 km || 
|-id=836 bgcolor=#d6d6d6
| 26836 ||  || — || August 6, 1991 || La Silla || E. W. Elst || — || align=right | 3.9 km || 
|-id=837 bgcolor=#fefefe
| 26837 Yoshitakaokazaki ||  ||  || September 7, 1991 || Geisei || T. Seki || — || align=right | 2.6 km || 
|-id=838 bgcolor=#fefefe
| 26838 ||  || — || September 11, 1991 || Palomar || H. E. Holt || — || align=right | 4.0 km || 
|-id=839 bgcolor=#d6d6d6
| 26839 ||  || — || September 12, 1991 || Palomar || H. E. Holt || — || align=right | 7.1 km || 
|-id=840 bgcolor=#fefefe
| 26840 ||  || — || September 4, 1991 || La Silla || E. W. Elst || — || align=right | 3.3 km || 
|-id=841 bgcolor=#E9E9E9
| 26841 ||  || — || October 10, 1991 || Palomar || J. Alu || — || align=right | 5.7 km || 
|-id=842 bgcolor=#d6d6d6
| 26842 Hefele ||  ||  || October 2, 1991 || Tautenburg Observatory || L. D. Schmadel, F. Börngen || — || align=right | 5.4 km || 
|-id=843 bgcolor=#fefefe
| 26843 ||  || — || October 28, 1991 || Kushiro || S. Ueda, H. Kaneda || — || align=right | 2.5 km || 
|-id=844 bgcolor=#fefefe
| 26844 ||  || — || November 12, 1991 || Kiyosato || S. Otomo || NYS || align=right | 3.0 km || 
|-id=845 bgcolor=#fefefe
| 26845 || 1992 AG || — || January 1, 1992 || Okutama || T. Hioki, S. Hayakawa || — || align=right | 5.2 km || 
|-id=846 bgcolor=#fefefe
| 26846 ||  || — || February 2, 1992 || La Silla || E. W. Elst || V || align=right | 3.7 km || 
|-id=847 bgcolor=#E9E9E9
| 26847 || 1992 DG || — || February 25, 1992 || Kushiro || S. Ueda, H. Kaneda || — || align=right | 11 km || 
|-id=848 bgcolor=#E9E9E9
| 26848 ||  || — || February 29, 1992 || La Silla || UESAC || — || align=right | 3.0 km || 
|-id=849 bgcolor=#E9E9E9
| 26849 De Paepe ||  ||  || April 23, 1992 || La Silla || E. W. Elst || RAF || align=right | 4.8 km || 
|-id=850 bgcolor=#E9E9E9
| 26850 || 1992 JL || — || May 1, 1992 || Palomar || K. J. Lawrence, P. Rose || — || align=right | 7.6 km || 
|-id=851 bgcolor=#E9E9E9
| 26851 Sarapul ||  ||  || July 30, 1992 || La Silla || E. W. Elst || — || align=right | 6.0 km || 
|-id=852 bgcolor=#E9E9E9
| 26852 ||  || — || October 19, 1992 || Kitami || K. Endate, K. Watanabe || — || align=right | 3.7 km || 
|-id=853 bgcolor=#fefefe
| 26853 ||  || — || October 20, 1992 || Palomar || H. E. Holt || — || align=right | 6.2 km || 
|-id=854 bgcolor=#E9E9E9
| 26854 || 1992 WB || — || November 16, 1992 || Kushiro || S. Ueda, H. Kaneda || — || align=right | 10 km || 
|-id=855 bgcolor=#d6d6d6
| 26855 ||  || — || November 17, 1992 || Kitami || K. Endate, K. Watanabe || — || align=right | 9.2 km || 
|-id=856 bgcolor=#fefefe
| 26856 ||  || — || January 23, 1993 || La Silla || E. W. Elst || — || align=right | 6.0 km || 
|-id=857 bgcolor=#fefefe
| 26857 Veracruz ||  ||  || February 19, 1993 || Haute Provence || E. W. Elst || — || align=right | 3.2 km || 
|-id=858 bgcolor=#FA8072
| 26858 Misterrogers || 1993 FR ||  || March 21, 1993 || Palomar || E. F. Helin || — || align=right | 6.3 km || 
|-id=859 bgcolor=#fefefe
| 26859 ||  || — || March 17, 1993 || La Silla || UESAC || FLO || align=right | 2.1 km || 
|-id=860 bgcolor=#fefefe
| 26860 ||  || — || March 19, 1993 || La Silla || UESAC || V || align=right | 1.9 km || 
|-id=861 bgcolor=#fefefe
| 26861 ||  || — || March 19, 1993 || La Silla || UESAC || — || align=right | 2.8 km || 
|-id=862 bgcolor=#fefefe
| 26862 ||  || — || March 21, 1993 || La Silla || UESAC || — || align=right | 1.8 km || 
|-id=863 bgcolor=#d6d6d6
| 26863 ||  || — || March 21, 1993 || La Silla || UESAC || — || align=right | 7.5 km || 
|-id=864 bgcolor=#E9E9E9
| 26864 ||  || — || March 21, 1993 || La Silla || UESAC || — || align=right | 6.4 km || 
|-id=865 bgcolor=#fefefe
| 26865 ||  || — || March 21, 1993 || La Silla || UESAC || — || align=right | 2.4 km || 
|-id=866 bgcolor=#fefefe
| 26866 ||  || — || March 19, 1993 || La Silla || UESAC || — || align=right | 2.2 km || 
|-id=867 bgcolor=#fefefe
| 26867 ||  || — || April 12, 1993 || La Silla || H. Debehogne || NYS || align=right | 2.1 km || 
|-id=868 bgcolor=#E9E9E9
| 26868 ||  || — || September 12, 1993 || Palomar || PCAS || — || align=right | 5.8 km || 
|-id=869 bgcolor=#E9E9E9
| 26869 ||  || — || September 17, 1993 || La Silla || E. W. Elst || — || align=right | 4.5 km || 
|-id=870 bgcolor=#E9E9E9
| 26870 ||  || — || October 9, 1993 || La Silla || E. W. Elst || — || align=right | 3.9 km || 
|-id=871 bgcolor=#E9E9E9
| 26871 Tanezrouft ||  ||  || October 9, 1993 || La Silla || E. W. Elst || — || align=right | 9.7 km || 
|-id=872 bgcolor=#E9E9E9
| 26872 || 1993 YR || — || December 18, 1993 || Nachi-Katsuura || Y. Shimizu, T. Urata || — || align=right | 2.4 km || 
|-id=873 bgcolor=#d6d6d6
| 26873 ||  || — || January 7, 1994 || Kitt Peak || Spacewatch || — || align=right | 4.3 km || 
|-id=874 bgcolor=#d6d6d6
| 26874 ||  || — || January 8, 1994 || Kitt Peak || Spacewatch || — || align=right | 13 km || 
|-id=875 bgcolor=#d6d6d6
| 26875 ||  || — || January 8, 1994 || Kitt Peak || Spacewatch || KOR || align=right | 4.8 km || 
|-id=876 bgcolor=#d6d6d6
| 26876 ||  || — || February 8, 1994 || La Silla || E. W. Elst || EOSslow || align=right | 7.7 km || 
|-id=877 bgcolor=#d6d6d6
| 26877 ||  || — || March 9, 1994 || Caussols || E. W. Elst || HYG || align=right | 7.4 km || 
|-id=878 bgcolor=#d6d6d6
| 26878 ||  || — || March 9, 1994 || Caussols || E. W. Elst || — || align=right | 11 km || 
|-id=879 bgcolor=#FA8072
| 26879 Haines ||  ||  || July 9, 1994 || Palomar || C. S. Shoemaker, E. M. Shoemaker || — || align=right | 3.0 km || 
|-id=880 bgcolor=#fefefe
| 26880 ||  || — || August 10, 1994 || La Silla || E. W. Elst || — || align=right | 3.1 km || 
|-id=881 bgcolor=#fefefe
| 26881 ||  || — || August 10, 1994 || La Silla || E. W. Elst || — || align=right | 2.3 km || 
|-id=882 bgcolor=#fefefe
| 26882 ||  || — || August 12, 1994 || La Silla || E. W. Elst || — || align=right | 2.6 km || 
|-id=883 bgcolor=#fefefe
| 26883 Marcelproust ||  ||  || August 12, 1994 || La Silla || E. W. Elst || — || align=right | 2.6 km || 
|-id=884 bgcolor=#fefefe
| 26884 ||  || — || September 5, 1994 || Kitt Peak || Spacewatch || NYS || align=right | 5.6 km || 
|-id=885 bgcolor=#fefefe
| 26885 ||  || — || September 3, 1994 || Palomar || E. F. Helin || FLO || align=right | 3.3 km || 
|-id=886 bgcolor=#fefefe
| 26886 ||  || — || October 2, 1994 || Kitami || K. Endate, K. Watanabe || FLO || align=right | 3.0 km || 
|-id=887 bgcolor=#fefefe
| 26887 Tokyogiants ||  ||  || October 14, 1994 || Kiso || I. Satō, H. Araki || — || align=right | 4.0 km || 
|-id=888 bgcolor=#fefefe
| 26888 || 1994 XH || — || December 3, 1994 || Oizumi || T. Kobayashi || — || align=right | 3.1 km || 
|-id=889 bgcolor=#E9E9E9
| 26889 ||  || — || January 23, 1995 || Oizumi || T. Kobayashi || — || align=right | 3.5 km || 
|-id=890 bgcolor=#fefefe
| 26890 ||  || — || January 27, 1995 || Nachi-Katsuura || Y. Shimizu, T. Urata || — || align=right | 4.2 km || 
|-id=891 bgcolor=#fefefe
| 26891 Johnbutler ||  ||  || February 7, 1995 || Siding Spring || D. J. Asher || H || align=right | 2.4 km || 
|-id=892 bgcolor=#E9E9E9
| 26892 ||  || — || March 23, 1995 || Kitt Peak || Spacewatch || — || align=right | 5.4 km || 
|-id=893 bgcolor=#E9E9E9
| 26893 ||  || — || March 27, 1995 || Kitt Peak || Spacewatch || AGN || align=right | 4.7 km || 
|-id=894 bgcolor=#d6d6d6
| 26894 ||  || — || May 29, 1995 || Stroncone || A. Vagnozzi || — || align=right | 7.5 km || 
|-id=895 bgcolor=#d6d6d6
| 26895 || 1995 MC || — || June 23, 1995 || Siding Spring || G. J. Garradd || — || align=right | 9.7 km || 
|-id=896 bgcolor=#fefefe
| 26896 Josefhudec || 1995 OY ||  || July 29, 1995 || Ondřejov || P. Pravec || — || align=right | 2.1 km || 
|-id=897 bgcolor=#E9E9E9
| 26897 Červená || 1995 PJ ||  || August 5, 1995 || Ondřejov || L. Kotková || — || align=right | 4.3 km || 
|-id=898 bgcolor=#d6d6d6
| 26898 ||  || — || September 26, 1995 || Kitt Peak || Spacewatch || — || align=right | 5.4 km || 
|-id=899 bgcolor=#fefefe
| 26899 ||  || — || October 20, 1995 || Oizumi || T. Kobayashi || — || align=right | 3.9 km || 
|-id=900 bgcolor=#fefefe
| 26900 ||  || — || November 23, 1995 || Farra d'Isonzo || Farra d'Isonzo || — || align=right | 2.9 km || 
|}

26901–27000 

|-bgcolor=#fefefe
| 26901 ||  || — || November 17, 1995 || Kitt Peak || Spacewatch || — || align=right | 1.7 km || 
|-id=902 bgcolor=#fefefe
| 26902 || 1995 YR || — || December 17, 1995 || Chichibu || N. Satō, T. Urata || — || align=right | 2.7 km || 
|-id=903 bgcolor=#E9E9E9
| 26903 ||  || — || December 20, 1995 || Siding Spring || R. H. McNaught || EUN || align=right | 4.9 km || 
|-id=904 bgcolor=#fefefe
| 26904 ||  || — || December 25, 1995 || Haleakala || NEAT || FLO || align=right | 2.3 km || 
|-id=905 bgcolor=#fefefe
| 26905 ||  || — || January 16, 1996 || Oizumi || T. Kobayashi || FLO || align=right | 2.7 km || 
|-id=906 bgcolor=#E9E9E9
| 26906 Rubidia ||  ||  || January 22, 1996 || Socorro || R. Weber || — || align=right | 3.4 km || 
|-id=907 bgcolor=#fefefe
| 26907 || 1996 EV || — || March 15, 1996 || Haleakala || NEAT || — || align=right | 6.4 km || 
|-id=908 bgcolor=#E9E9E9
| 26908 Lebesgue || 1996 GK ||  || April 11, 1996 || Prescott || P. G. Comba || — || align=right | 1.8 km || 
|-id=909 bgcolor=#E9E9E9
| 26909 Lefschetz ||  ||  || April 24, 1996 || Prescott || P. G. Comba || — || align=right | 3.2 km || 
|-id=910 bgcolor=#E9E9E9
| 26910 ||  || — || April 20, 1996 || La Silla || E. W. Elst || HEN || align=right | 3.4 km || 
|-id=911 bgcolor=#E9E9E9
| 26911 ||  || — || May 13, 1996 || Haleakala || NEAT || — || align=right | 3.5 km || 
|-id=912 bgcolor=#E9E9E9
| 26912 ||  || — || May 13, 1996 || Haleakala || NEAT || EUN || align=right | 5.5 km || 
|-id=913 bgcolor=#E9E9E9
| 26913 ||  || — || May 11, 1996 || Xinglong || SCAP || EUN || align=right | 3.6 km || 
|-id=914 bgcolor=#E9E9E9
| 26914 ||  || — || May 20, 1996 || Campo Imperatore || A. Boattini, A. Di Clemente || — || align=right | 3.1 km || 
|-id=915 bgcolor=#E9E9E9
| 26915 ||  || — || June 14, 1996 || Haleakala || NEAT || EUN || align=right | 5.6 km || 
|-id=916 bgcolor=#fefefe
| 26916 ||  || — || September 13, 1996 || Catalina Station || C. W. Hergenrother || H || align=right | 3.5 km || 
|-id=917 bgcolor=#d6d6d6
| 26917 Pianoro ||  ||  || September 15, 1996 || Pianoro || V. Goretti || — || align=right | 11 km || 
|-id=918 bgcolor=#d6d6d6
| 26918 ||  || — || September 13, 1996 || Kitt Peak || Spacewatch || — || align=right | 4.3 km || 
|-id=919 bgcolor=#d6d6d6
| 26919 Shoichimiyata ||  ||  || September 3, 1996 || Nanyo || T. Okuni || — || align=right | 13 km || 
|-id=920 bgcolor=#fefefe
| 26920 ||  || — || October 11, 1996 || Haleakala || NEAT || H || align=right | 1.5 km || 
|-id=921 bgcolor=#d6d6d6
| 26921 Jensallit ||  ||  || October 15, 1996 || Southend Bradfield || G. Sallit || THM || align=right | 9.4 km || 
|-id=922 bgcolor=#d6d6d6
| 26922 Samara ||  ||  || October 8, 1996 || La Silla || E. W. Elst || — || align=right | 11 km || 
|-id=923 bgcolor=#fefefe
| 26923 || 1996 YZ || — || December 20, 1996 || Oizumi || T. Kobayashi || NYS || align=right | 1.9 km || 
|-id=924 bgcolor=#d6d6d6
| 26924 Johnharvey ||  ||  || December 30, 1996 || Goodricke-Pigott || R. A. Tucker || — || align=right | 7.1 km || 
|-id=925 bgcolor=#d6d6d6
| 26925 ||  || — || January 3, 1997 || Oizumi || T. Kobayashi || — || align=right | 7.9 km || 
|-id=926 bgcolor=#E9E9E9
| 26926 ||  || — || January 2, 1997 || Kitt Peak || Spacewatch || — || align=right | 5.6 km || 
|-id=927 bgcolor=#fefefe
| 26927 ||  || — || February 3, 1997 || Haleakala || NEAT || — || align=right | 3.1 km || 
|-id=928 bgcolor=#fefefe
| 26928 ||  || — || February 6, 1997 || Oizumi || T. Kobayashi || — || align=right | 2.4 km || 
|-id=929 bgcolor=#d6d6d6
| 26929 ||  || — || February 7, 1997 || Kitt Peak || Spacewatch || HIL3:2 || align=right | 14 km || 
|-id=930 bgcolor=#fefefe
| 26930 ||  || — || February 12, 1997 || Oizumi || T. Kobayashi || FLO || align=right | 3.0 km || 
|-id=931 bgcolor=#fefefe
| 26931 ||  || — || February 13, 1997 || Oizumi || T. Kobayashi || FLO || align=right | 2.1 km || 
|-id=932 bgcolor=#fefefe
| 26932 ||  || — || March 4, 1997 || Oizumi || T. Kobayashi || FLO || align=right | 1.9 km || 
|-id=933 bgcolor=#fefefe
| 26933 ||  || — || March 2, 1997 || Kitt Peak || Spacewatch || — || align=right | 1.8 km || 
|-id=934 bgcolor=#fefefe
| 26934 Jordancotler ||  ||  || March 4, 1997 || Socorro || LINEAR || — || align=right | 2.9 km || 
|-id=935 bgcolor=#fefefe
| 26935 Vireday ||  ||  || March 15, 1997 || USNO Flagstaff || C. B. Luginbuhl || — || align=right | 1.9 km || 
|-id=936 bgcolor=#fefefe
| 26936 ||  || — || March 12, 1997 || La Silla || E. W. Elst || V || align=right | 2.2 km || 
|-id=937 bgcolor=#fefefe
| 26937 Makimiyamoto ||  ||  || March 31, 1997 || Kuma Kogen || A. Nakamura || — || align=right | 2.3 km || 
|-id=938 bgcolor=#fefefe
| 26938 Jackli ||  ||  || March 31, 1997 || Socorro || LINEAR || — || align=right | 2.2 km || 
|-id=939 bgcolor=#fefefe
| 26939 Jiachengli ||  ||  || March 31, 1997 || Socorro || LINEAR || V || align=right | 1.7 km || 
|-id=940 bgcolor=#fefefe
| 26940 Quintero ||  ||  || April 2, 1997 || Socorro || LINEAR || — || align=right | 3.1 km || 
|-id=941 bgcolor=#fefefe
| 26941 ||  || — || April 3, 1997 || Socorro || LINEAR || — || align=right | 1.9 km || 
|-id=942 bgcolor=#fefefe
| 26942 Nealkuhn ||  ||  || April 3, 1997 || Socorro || LINEAR || — || align=right | 3.8 km || 
|-id=943 bgcolor=#fefefe
| 26943 ||  || — || April 3, 1997 || Socorro || LINEAR || — || align=right | 3.5 km || 
|-id=944 bgcolor=#fefefe
| 26944 ||  || — || April 6, 1997 || Socorro || LINEAR || — || align=right | 2.0 km || 
|-id=945 bgcolor=#fefefe
| 26945 Sushko ||  ||  || April 6, 1997 || Socorro || LINEAR || — || align=right | 3.4 km || 
|-id=946 bgcolor=#fefefe
| 26946 Ziziyu ||  ||  || April 6, 1997 || Socorro || LINEAR || — || align=right | 2.5 km || 
|-id=947 bgcolor=#fefefe
| 26947 Angelawang ||  ||  || April 6, 1997 || Socorro || LINEAR || NYS || align=right | 1.7 km || 
|-id=948 bgcolor=#fefefe
| 26948 Annasato ||  ||  || April 6, 1997 || Socorro || LINEAR || — || align=right | 2.3 km || 
|-id=949 bgcolor=#fefefe
| 26949 ||  || — || May 3, 1997 || Xinglong || SCAP || — || align=right | 3.0 km || 
|-id=950 bgcolor=#fefefe
| 26950 Legendre ||  ||  || May 11, 1997 || Prescott || P. G. Comba || NYS || align=right | 2.1 km || 
|-id=951 bgcolor=#fefefe
| 26951 ||  || — || May 3, 1997 || La Silla || E. W. Elst || V || align=right | 1.8 km || 
|-id=952 bgcolor=#fefefe
| 26952 ||  || — || May 3, 1997 || La Silla || E. W. Elst || — || align=right | 4.0 km || 
|-id=953 bgcolor=#fefefe
| 26953 ||  || — || May 29, 1997 || Kitt Peak || Spacewatch || — || align=right | 2.5 km || 
|-id=954 bgcolor=#fefefe
| 26954 Skadiang || 1997 MG ||  || June 25, 1997 || Campo Imperatore || A. Boattini || — || align=right | 3.3 km || 
|-id=955 bgcolor=#fefefe
| 26955 Lie ||  ||  || June 30, 1997 || Prescott || P. G. Comba || — || align=right | 2.9 km || 
|-id=956 bgcolor=#fefefe
| 26956 ||  || — || June 28, 1997 || Socorro || LINEAR || — || align=right | 2.4 km || 
|-id=957 bgcolor=#fefefe
| 26957 ||  || — || June 28, 1997 || Socorro || LINEAR || — || align=right | 4.5 km || 
|-id=958 bgcolor=#fefefe
| 26958 ||  || — || June 28, 1997 || Socorro || LINEAR || NYS || align=right | 2.5 km || 
|-id=959 bgcolor=#E9E9E9
| 26959 ||  || — || June 30, 1997 || Kitt Peak || Spacewatch || MIT || align=right | 8.1 km || 
|-id=960 bgcolor=#fefefe
| 26960 Liouville ||  ||  || July 8, 1997 || Prescott || P. G. Comba || — || align=right | 4.7 km || 
|-id=961 bgcolor=#E9E9E9
| 26961 ||  || — || July 29, 1997 || Bédoin || P. Antonini || — || align=right | 4.0 km || 
|-id=962 bgcolor=#E9E9E9
| 26962 ||  || — || August 13, 1997 || Kleť || Kleť Obs. || — || align=right | 5.6 km || 
|-id=963 bgcolor=#E9E9E9
| 26963 Palorapavý ||  ||  || August 13, 1997 || Ondřejov || P. Pravec || RAF || align=right | 2.5 km || 
|-id=964 bgcolor=#E9E9E9
| 26964 || 1997 RO || — || September 1, 1997 || Haleakala || NEAT || — || align=right | 3.6 km || 
|-id=965 bgcolor=#E9E9E9
| 26965 ||  || — || September 3, 1997 || Majorca || Á. López J., R. Pacheco || — || align=right | 5.5 km || 
|-id=966 bgcolor=#E9E9E9
| 26966 ||  || — || September 4, 1997 || Xinglong || SCAP || — || align=right | 4.1 km || 
|-id=967 bgcolor=#E9E9E9
| 26967 ||  || — || September 4, 1997 || Gekko || T. Kagawa, T. Urata || — || align=right | 7.3 km || 
|-id=968 bgcolor=#E9E9E9
| 26968 ||  || — || September 10, 1997 || Bergisch Gladbach || W. Bickel || — || align=right | 10 km || 
|-id=969 bgcolor=#E9E9E9
| 26969 Biver || 1997 SE ||  || September 20, 1997 || Kleť || M. Tichý, J. Tichá || — || align=right | 4.4 km || 
|-id=970 bgcolor=#d6d6d6
| 26970 Eliáš ||  ||  || September 23, 1997 || Ondřejov || P. Pravec || KAR || align=right | 2.7 km || 
|-id=971 bgcolor=#E9E9E9
| 26971 Sezimovo Ústí ||  ||  || September 25, 1997 || Kleť || M. Tichý, Z. Moravec || — || align=right | 3.0 km || 
|-id=972 bgcolor=#E9E9E9
| 26972 ||  || — || September 21, 1997 || Church Stretton || S. P. Laurie || — || align=right | 5.6 km || 
|-id=973 bgcolor=#E9E9E9
| 26973 Lála ||  ||  || September 29, 1997 || Ondřejov || P. Pravec, M. Wolf || — || align=right | 4.5 km || 
|-id=974 bgcolor=#E9E9E9
| 26974 ||  || — || October 8, 1997 || Gekko || T. Kagawa, T. Urata || PAD || align=right | 5.3 km || 
|-id=975 bgcolor=#E9E9E9
| 26975 ||  || — || October 8, 1997 || Uenohara || N. Kawasato || — || align=right | 2.2 km || 
|-id=976 bgcolor=#E9E9E9
| 26976 ||  || — || October 11, 1997 || Xinglong || SCAP || PAD || align=right | 8.9 km || 
|-id=977 bgcolor=#E9E9E9
| 26977 ||  || — || October 26, 1997 || Oizumi || T. Kobayashi || slow || align=right | 6.6 km || 
|-id=978 bgcolor=#d6d6d6
| 26978 ||  || — || October 20, 1997 || Xinglong || SCAP || — || align=right | 8.0 km || 
|-id=979 bgcolor=#E9E9E9
| 26979 ||  || — || October 29, 1997 || Bédoin || P. Antonini || — || align=right | 6.3 km || 
|-id=980 bgcolor=#E9E9E9
| 26980 ||  || — || October 29, 1997 || Woomera || F. B. Zoltowski || — || align=right | 3.8 km || 
|-id=981 bgcolor=#E9E9E9
| 26981 ||  || — || October 25, 1997 || Church Stretton || S. P. Laurie || — || align=right | 2.7 km || 
|-id=982 bgcolor=#d6d6d6
| 26982 ||  || — || October 25, 1997 || Nyukasa || M. Hirasawa, S. Suzuki || — || align=right | 6.4 km || 
|-id=983 bgcolor=#E9E9E9
| 26983 || 1997 VA || — || November 1, 1997 || Woomera || F. B. Zoltowski || — || align=right | 3.2 km || 
|-id=984 bgcolor=#d6d6d6
| 26984 Fernand-Roland || 1997 VV ||  || November 1, 1997 || Village-Neuf || C. Demeautis, D. Matter || — || align=right | 15 km || 
|-id=985 bgcolor=#d6d6d6
| 26985 ||  || — || November 6, 1997 || Oizumi || T. Kobayashi || — || align=right | 11 km || 
|-id=986 bgcolor=#d6d6d6
| 26986 Čáslavská ||  ||  || November 4, 1997 || Ondřejov || L. Kotková || EOS || align=right | 5.8 km || 
|-id=987 bgcolor=#d6d6d6
| 26987 ||  || — || November 21, 1997 || Xinglong || SCAP || KOR || align=right | 4.6 km || 
|-id=988 bgcolor=#d6d6d6
| 26988 ||  || — || November 23, 1997 || Kitt Peak || Spacewatch || — || align=right | 8.6 km || 
|-id=989 bgcolor=#d6d6d6
| 26989 ||  || — || November 19, 1997 || Nachi-Katsuura || Y. Shimizu, T. Urata || EOS || align=right | 8.6 km || 
|-id=990 bgcolor=#d6d6d6
| 26990 Culbertson ||  ||  || November 23, 1997 || Chichibu || N. Satō || EOS || align=right | 7.3 km || 
|-id=991 bgcolor=#E9E9E9
| 26991 ||  || — || November 29, 1997 || Socorro || LINEAR || HEN || align=right | 6.0 km || 
|-id=992 bgcolor=#d6d6d6
| 26992 ||  || — || November 26, 1997 || Socorro || LINEAR || EOS || align=right | 6.0 km || 
|-id=993 bgcolor=#d6d6d6
| 26993 Littlewood ||  ||  || December 3, 1997 || Prescott || P. G. Comba || — || align=right | 4.0 km || 
|-id=994 bgcolor=#d6d6d6
| 26994 ||  || — || December 2, 1997 || Nachi-Katsuura || Y. Shimizu, T. Urata || — || align=right | 6.7 km || 
|-id=995 bgcolor=#d6d6d6
| 26995 ||  || — || December 5, 1997 || Nachi-Katsuura || Y. Shimizu, T. Urata || EOS || align=right | 6.6 km || 
|-id=996 bgcolor=#E9E9E9
| 26996 ||  || — || December 16, 1997 || Xinglong || SCAP || — || align=right | 3.7 km || 
|-id=997 bgcolor=#d6d6d6
| 26997 ||  || — || December 25, 1997 || Oizumi || T. Kobayashi || 7:4 || align=right | 15 km || 
|-id=998 bgcolor=#d6d6d6
| 26998 Iriso ||  ||  || December 25, 1997 || Chichibu || N. Satō || — || align=right | 9.0 km || 
|-id=999 bgcolor=#d6d6d6
| 26999 ||  || — || January 28, 1998 || Haleakala || NEAT || — || align=right | 5.8 km || 
|-id=000 bgcolor=#d6d6d6
| 27000 ||  || — || January 22, 1998 || Socorro || LINEAR || — || align=right | 15 km || 
|}

References

External links 
 Discovery Circumstances: Numbered Minor Planets (25001)–(30000) (IAU Minor Planet Center)

0026